= Wrist strap =

Wrist strap can mean:

- A lanyard worn around the wrist
- A watch strap
- An anti-static wrist strap
- Forearm lifting strap, a lifting device for manual handling of loads

== See also ==
- Wristband
- Wrist brace
- Wrist guard
- Wristlet
