= Usage of personal protective equipment =

Use of protective clothing against hazards

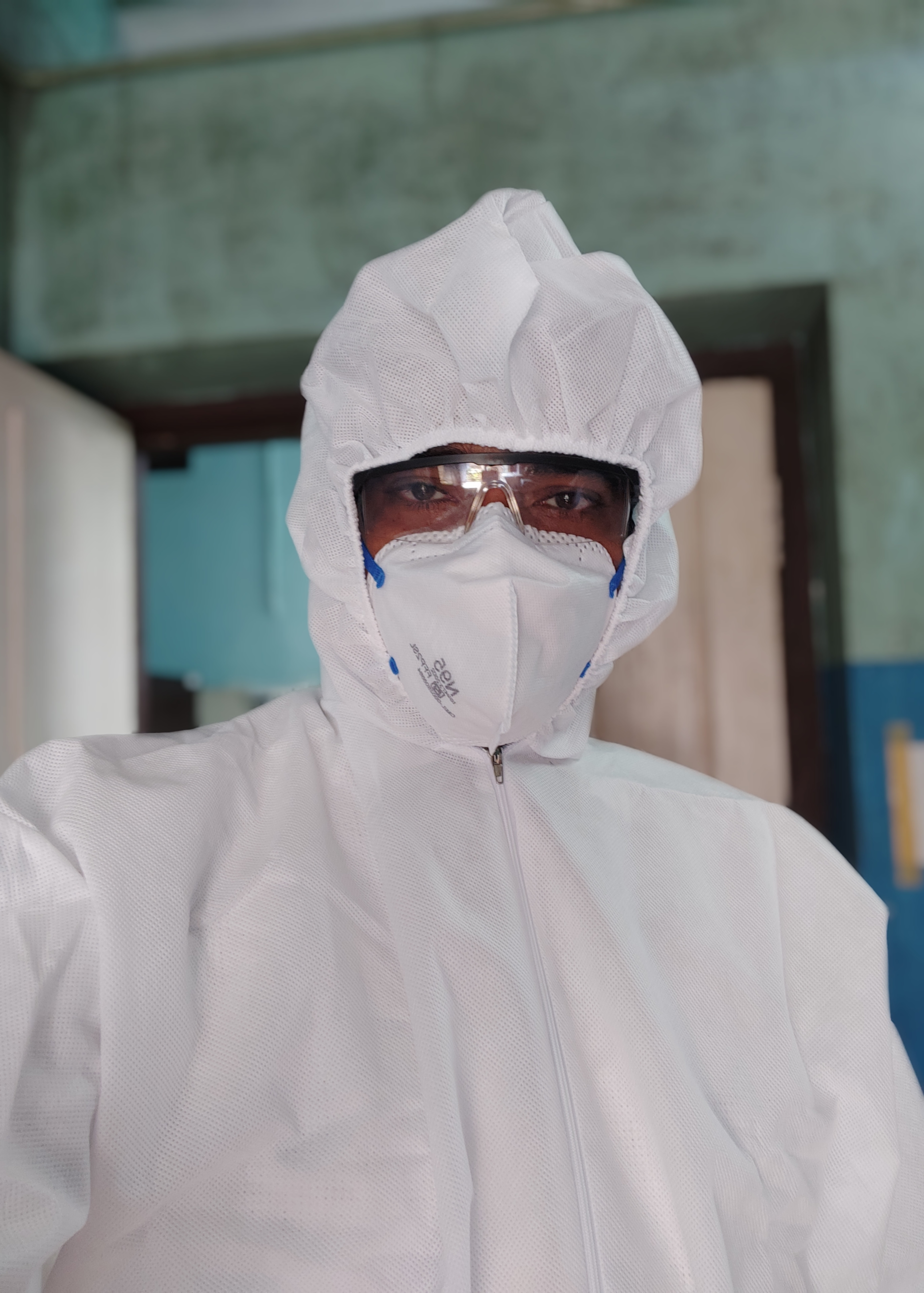
A doctor wearing personal protective equipment for treating patients with COVID-19

The use of personal protective equipment (PPE) is inherent in the theory of universal precaution, which requires specialized clothing or equipment for the protection of individuals from hazard. The term is defined by the Occupational Safety and Health Administration (OSHA), which is responsible for PPE regulation, as the "equipment that protects employees from serious injury or illness resulting from contact with chemical, radiological, physical, electrical, mechanical, or other hazards." While there are common forms of PPEs such as gloves, eye shields, and respirators, the standard set in the OSHA definition indicates a wide coverage. This means that PPE involves a sizable range of equipment. There are several ways to classify them such as how gears could be physiological or environmental. The following list, however, sorts personal protective equipment according to function and body area.

== PPE by usage ==
=== Combat ===
The modern PPE used in combat has been increasingly designed to address the emergent dangers poised in the increasing mix of conventional and unconventional conflicts demonstrated in the American experience in Iraq and Afghanistan. The combat protective equipment today is often typified by flame resistance, improved body armor, and reduced weight, among other advances. The gears are shown in the following list, which includes PPEs for defense against ballistic weapons are commonly worn by military and law enforcement personnel.

==== Shield ====
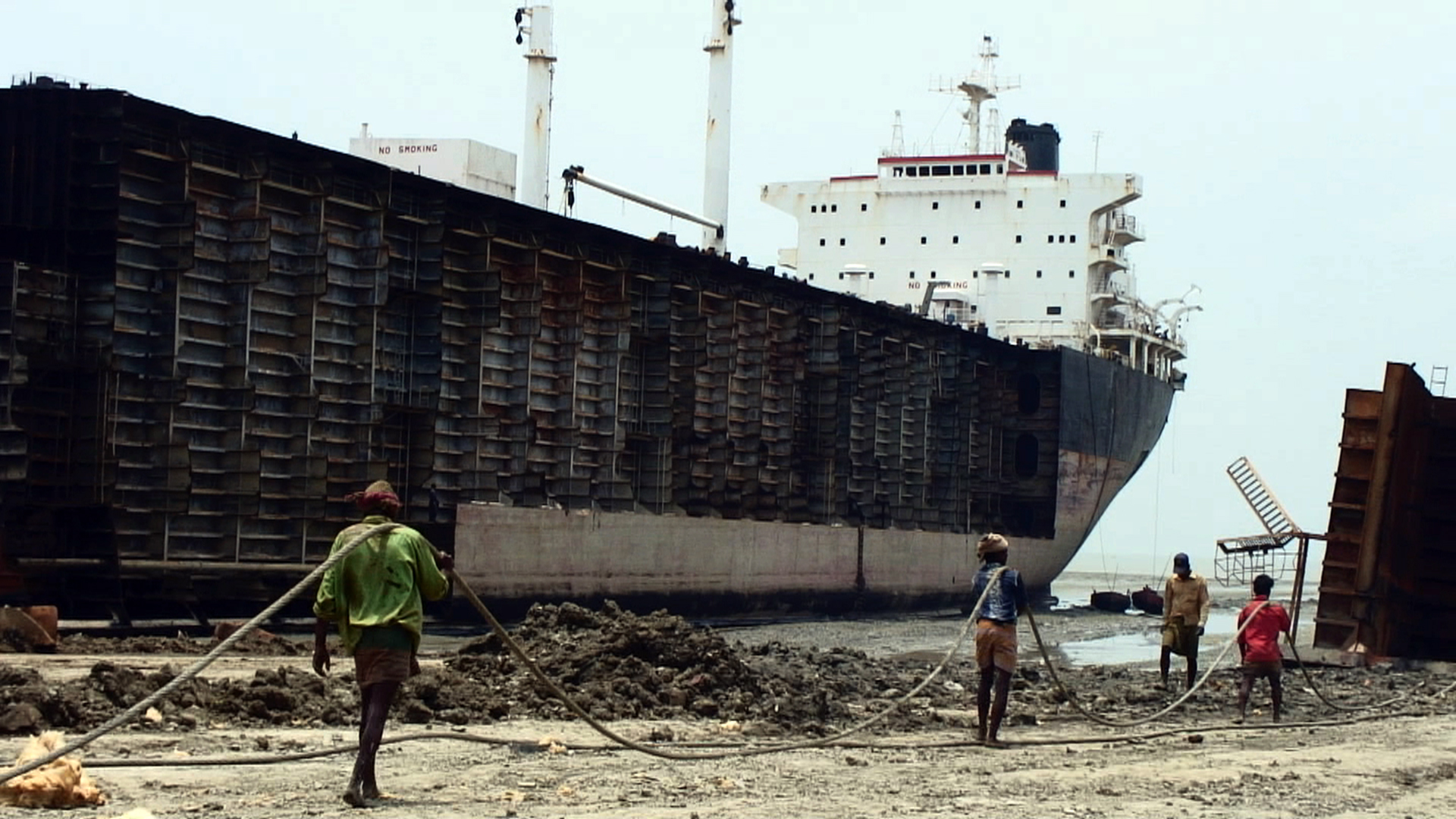
Workers at Chittagong ship breaking yard, without safety boots and hard hats

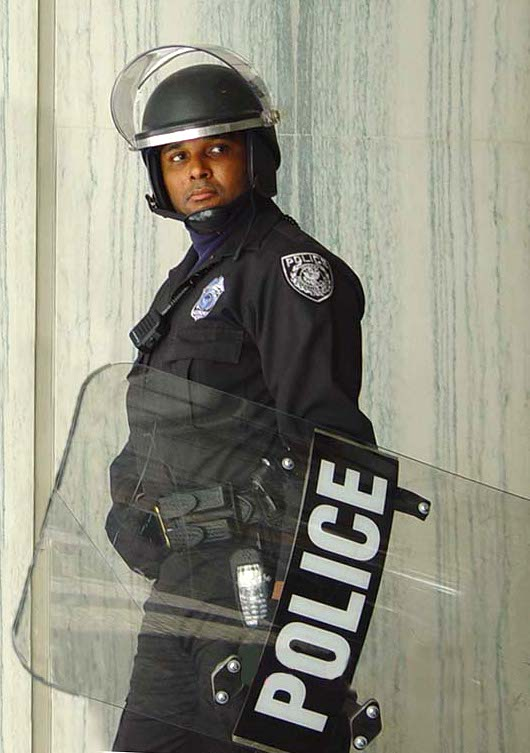
U.S. police officer with a riot shield

A shield is held in the hand or arm. Its purpose is to intercept attacks, either by stopping projectiles such as arrows or by glancing a blow to the side of the shield-user. Shields vary greatly in size, ranging from large shields that protect the user's entire body to small shields that are mostly for use in hand-to-hand combat. Shields also vary a great deal in thickness; whereas some shields were made of thick wooden planking, to protect soldiers from spears and crossbow bolts, other shields were thinner and designed mainly for glancing blows away (such as a sword blow). In prehistory, shields were made of wood, animal hide, or wicker. In antiquity and in the Middle Ages, shields were used by foot soldiers and mounted soldiers. Even after the invention of gunpowder and firearms, shields continued to be used. In the 18th century, Scottish clans continued to use small shields, and in the 19th century, some non-industrialized peoples continued to use shields. In the 20th and 21st century, shields are used by military and police units that specialize in anti-terrorist action, hostage rescue, and siege-breaching.

==== Torso ====
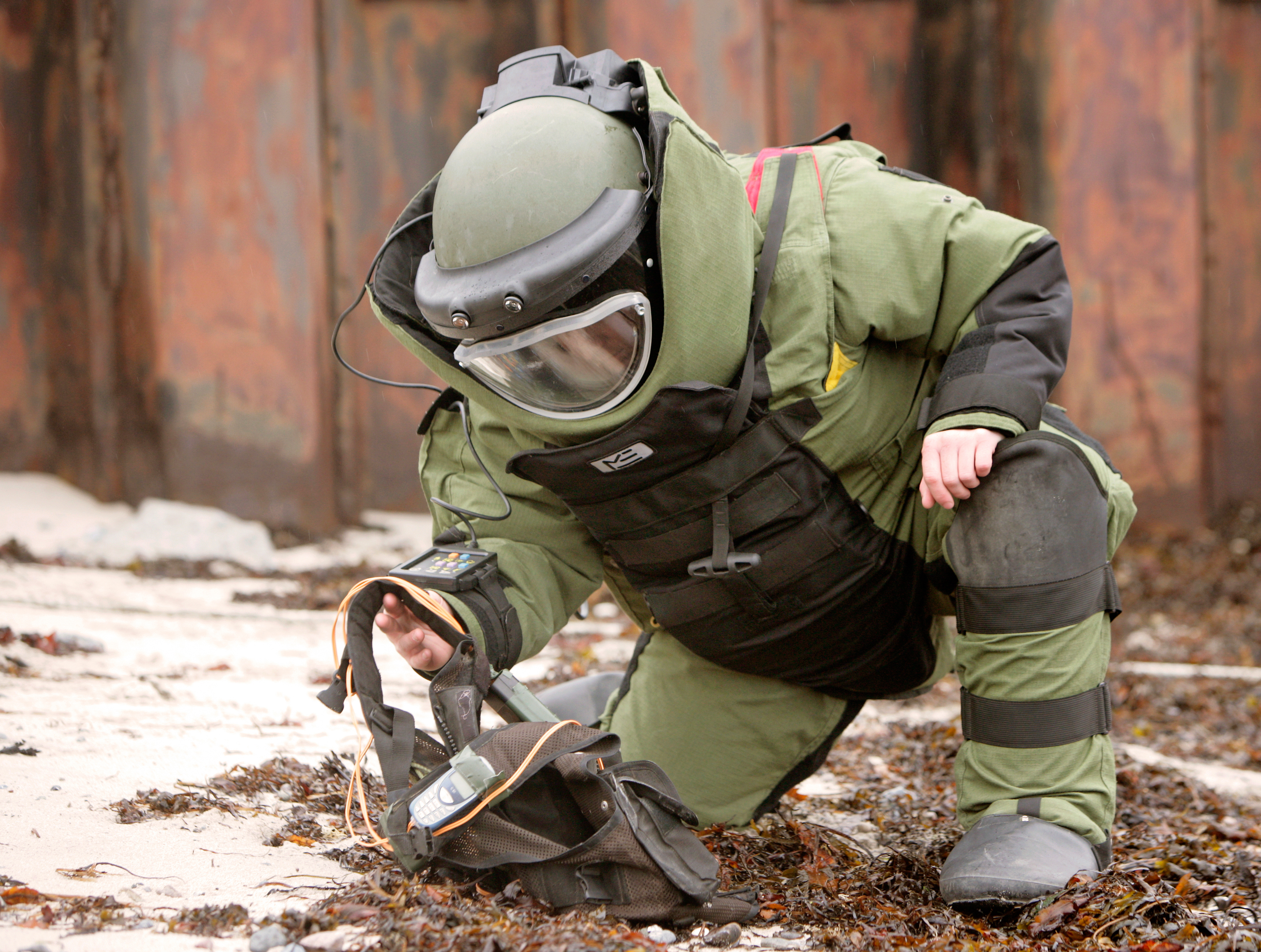
An EOD technician wearing a bomb suit

A ballistic vest helps absorb the impact from firearm-fired projectiles and shrapnel from explosions, and is worn on the torso. Soft vests are made from many layers of woven or laminated fibers and can be capable of protecting the wearer from small caliber handgun and shotgun projectiles, and small fragments from explosives such as hand grenades.

Metal or ceramic plates can be used with a soft vest, providing additional protection from rifle rounds, and metallic components or tightly-woven fiber layers can give soft armor resistance to stab and slash attacks from a knife. Soft vests are commonly worn by police forces, private citizens and private security guards or bodyguards, whereas hard-plate reinforced vests are mainly worn by combat soldiers, police tactical units and hostage rescue teams.

Modern body armor may combine a ballistic vest with other items of protective clothing, such as a combat helmet. Vests intended for police and military use may also include ballistic shoulder and side protection armor components, and bomb disposal officers wear heavy armor and helmets with face visors and spine protection.

==== Head ====
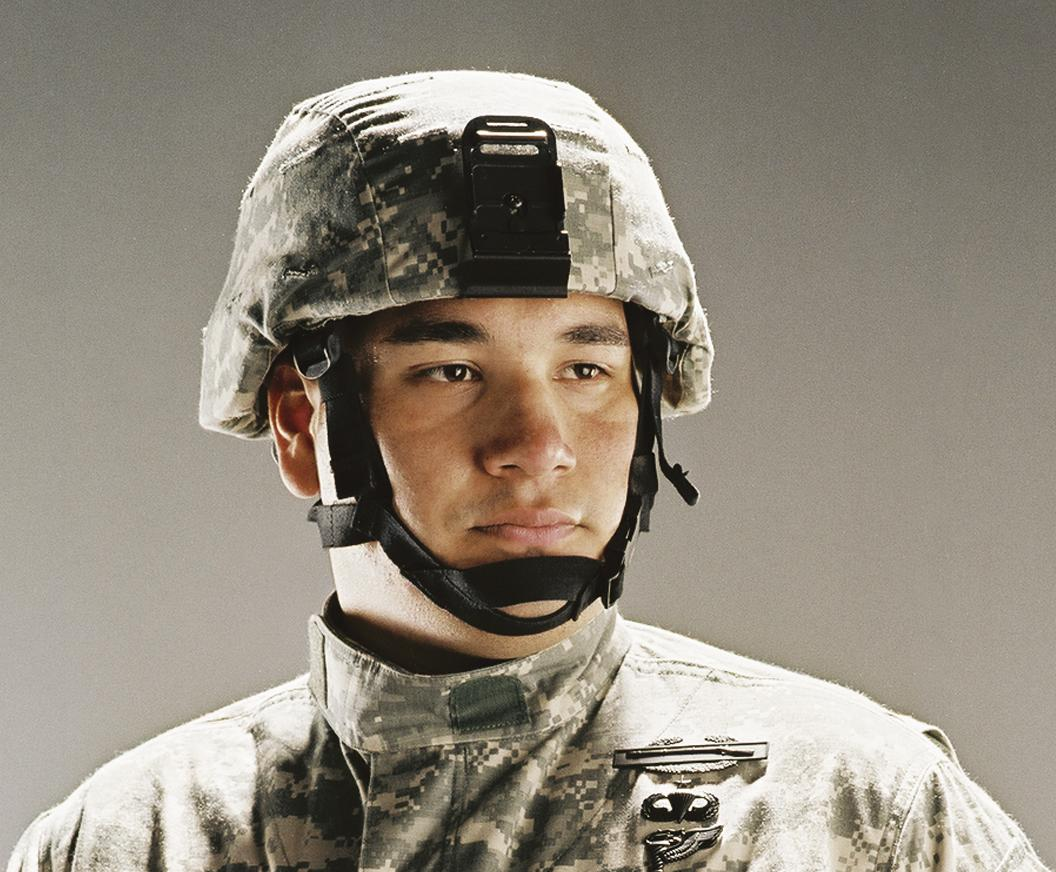
A U.S. soldier wearing a combat helmet.

A combat helmet are among the oldest forms of personal protective equipment, and are known to have been worn by the Assyrians around 900BC, followed by the ancient Greeks and Romans, throughout the Middle Ages, and up to the end of the 1600s by many combatants. Their materials and construction became more advanced as weapons became more and more powerful. Initially constructed from leather and brass, and then bronze and iron during the Bronze and Iron Ages, they soon came to be made entirely from forged steel in many societies after about 950AD. At that time, they were purely military equipment, protecting the head from cutting blows with swords, flying arrows, and low-velocity musketry. Today's militaries often use high-quality helmets made of ballistic materials such as Kevlar and Aramid, which have excellent bullet and fragmentation stopping power. Some helmets also have good non-ballistic protective qualities, though many do not. Non-ballistic injuries may be caused by many things, such as concussive shockwaves from explosions, physical attacks, motor vehicle accidents, or falls.

A ballistic face mask, is designed to protect the wearer from ballistic threats. Ballistic face masks are usually made of kevlar or other bullet resistant materials and the inside of the mask may be padded for shock absorption, depending on the design. Due to weight restrictions, protection levels range only up to NIJ Level IIIA.

==== Respirator ====
A gas mask is worn over the face to protect the wearer from inhaling "airborne pollutants" and toxic gases. The mask forms a sealed cover over the nose and mouth, but may also cover the eyes and other vulnerable soft tissues of the face. Airborne toxic materials may be gaseous or particulate. Many gas masks include protection from both types. During riots where tear gas or CS-gas is employed by riot police, gas masks are commonly used by police and rioters alike.

==== Limbs ====
Protection of limbs from bombs is provided by a bombsuit.

=== Sports ===
==== Limbs ====
A pair of fingerless cycling gloves.

Gloves are frequently used to keep the hands warm, a function that is particularly necessary when cycling in cold weather. The hands are also relatively inactive, and do not have a great deal of muscle mass, which also contributes to the possibility of chill. Gloves are therefore vital for insulating the hands from cold, wind, and evaporative cooling. Putting a hand out to break a fall is a natural reaction, however, the hands are one of the more difficult parts of the body to repair. There is little or no spare skin, and immobilising the hands sufficiently to promote healing involves significant inconvenience to the patient. Fingerless gloves, have a lightly padded palm of leather (natural or synthetic), gel or other material. Full-finger gloves are useful in winter, when real warmth is not an issue. These are also generally waterproof but will become soggy in heavy rain.

=== Construction ===
==== Head ====
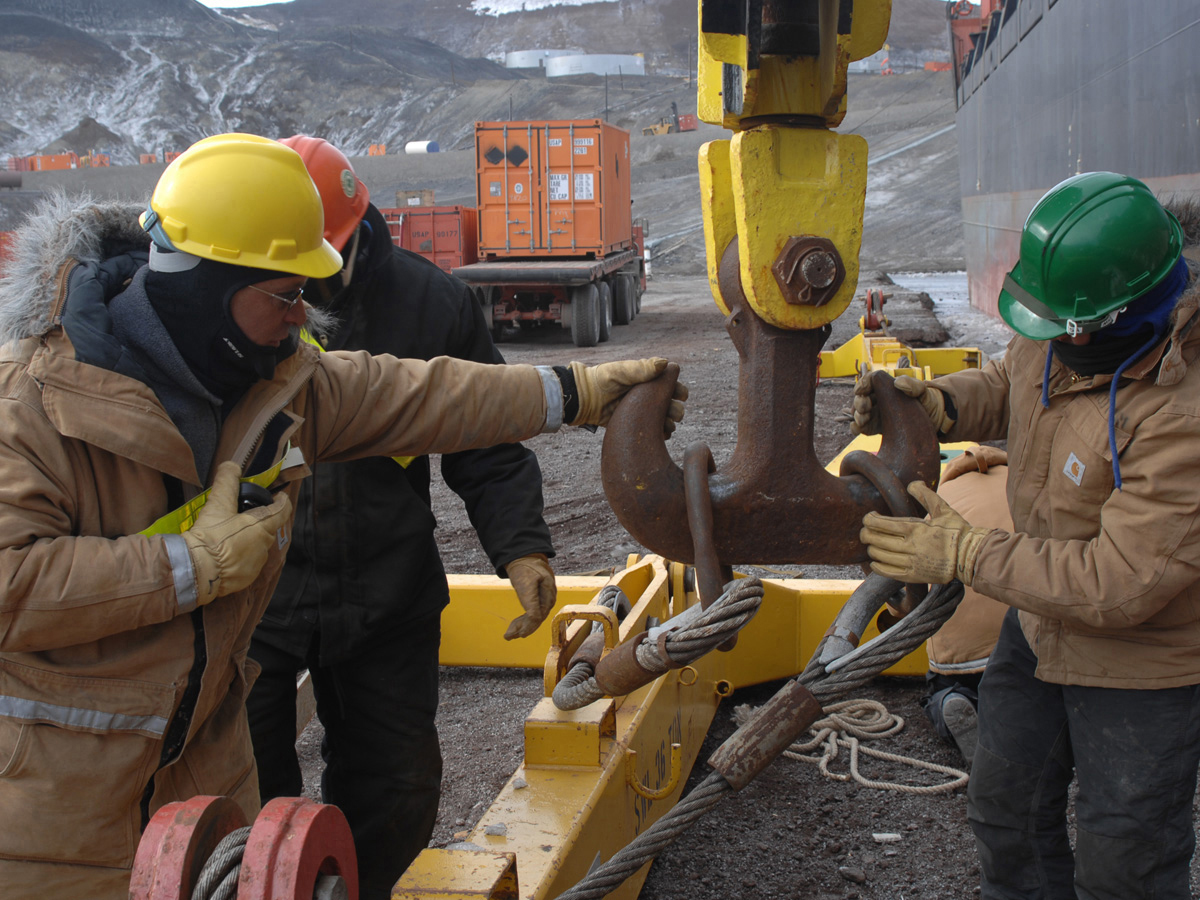
U.S. Navy sailors loading cargo onto a container ship in Antarctica

A hard hat is a type of helmet predominantly used in workplace environments, such as construction sites, to protect the head from injury by falling objects, impact with other objects, debris, bad weather and electric shock. Inside the helmet is a suspension that spreads the helmet's weight over the top of the head. It also provides a space of approximately 3 cm (1.2 inch) between the helmet's shell and the wearer's head so that if an object strikes the shell, the impact is less likely to be transmitted directly to the skull. Rigid plastic has been the most common material.

==== Respiratory system ====
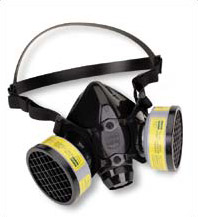
A half face particulate mask.

A respirator is designed to protect the wearer from inhaling harmful dusts, fumes, vapors, and/or gases. Respirators come in a wide range of types and sizes used by the military, private industry, and the public. Respirators range from cheaper, single-use, disposable masks to reusable models with replaceable cartridges. There are two main categories: the air-purifying respirator, which forces contaminated air through a filtering element, and the air-supplied respirator, in which an alternate supply of fresh air is delivered. Within each category, different techniques are employed to reduce or eliminate noxious airborne contents. The term respirator in the hospital setting refers to the N95 filtering face piece masks that are commonly used to care for patients with Tuberculosis. There was much controversy over the use of these masks during the H1N1 outbreak of 2009.

== PPE by body area ==
=== Protective headgear ===
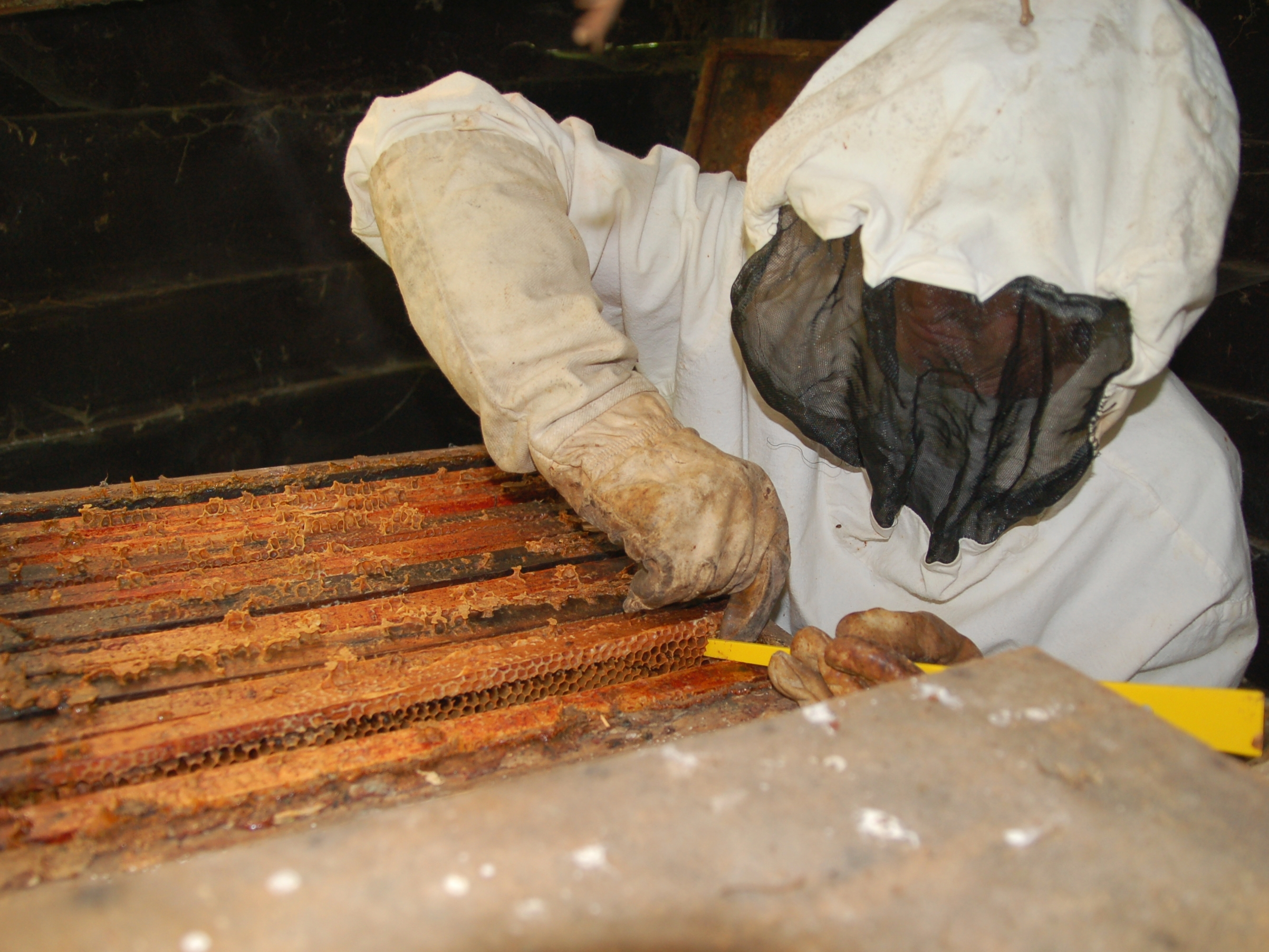
a beekeeping hat, veil, and suit

==== Masks ====
Some masks made of hard material like those used by goaltenders in ice hockey (a goalie mask) and catchers in baseball as protection against being struck in the face.

- For gas masks and similar, see #Respiratory protection.
- See Mask (disambiguation)

==== Helmets ====
See Helmet#Types of helmet

==== Eye protection ====
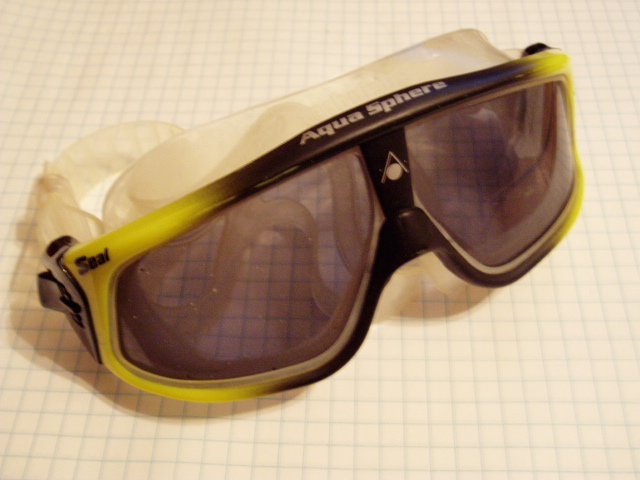
Goggles

See Eye protection.

==== Hearing protection ====
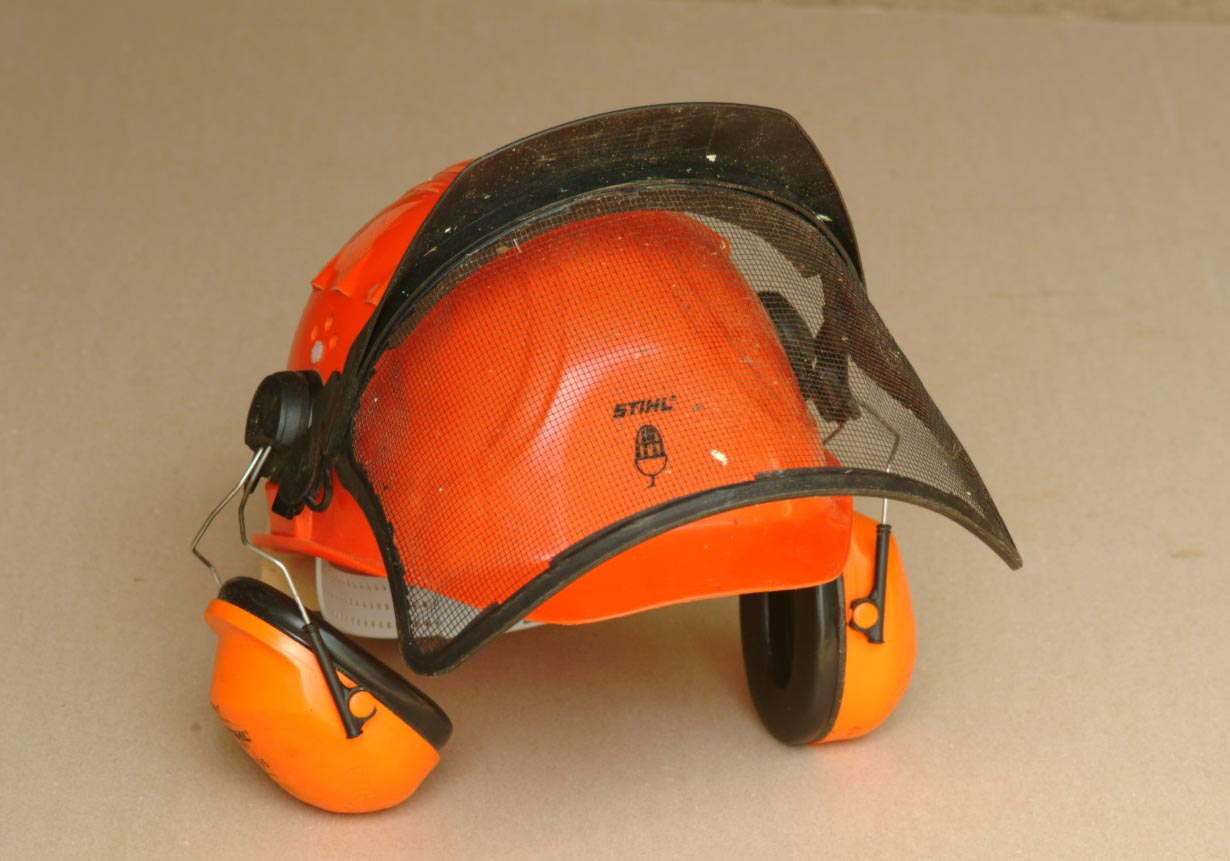
ear defenders and visor on a safety helmet

- Earplug
- Earmuffs
- Earpads/earflaps

==== Other head/neck protection ====
- Throat guard
- Headguard (Head guard)
- Boxing headgear
- Mouthguard
- Armored/insulated hood
- Association football headgear

=== Arm/shoulder protection ===
- Shoulder pads (sport)
- Forearm guard
- Fist guard
- Knuckle guard
- Wrist guard
- Elbow guard
- Elbow pad
- Hand/Wrist Wraps

=== Hand protection ===
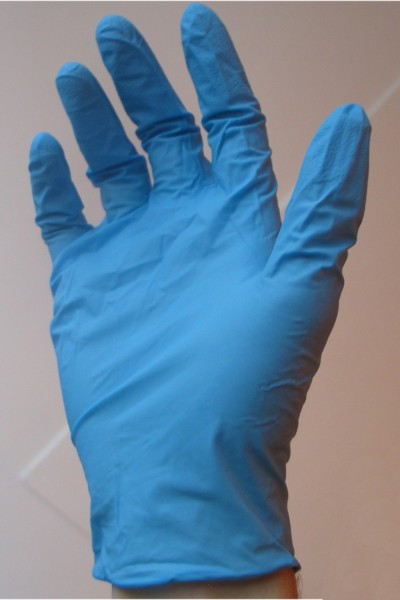
nitrile glove

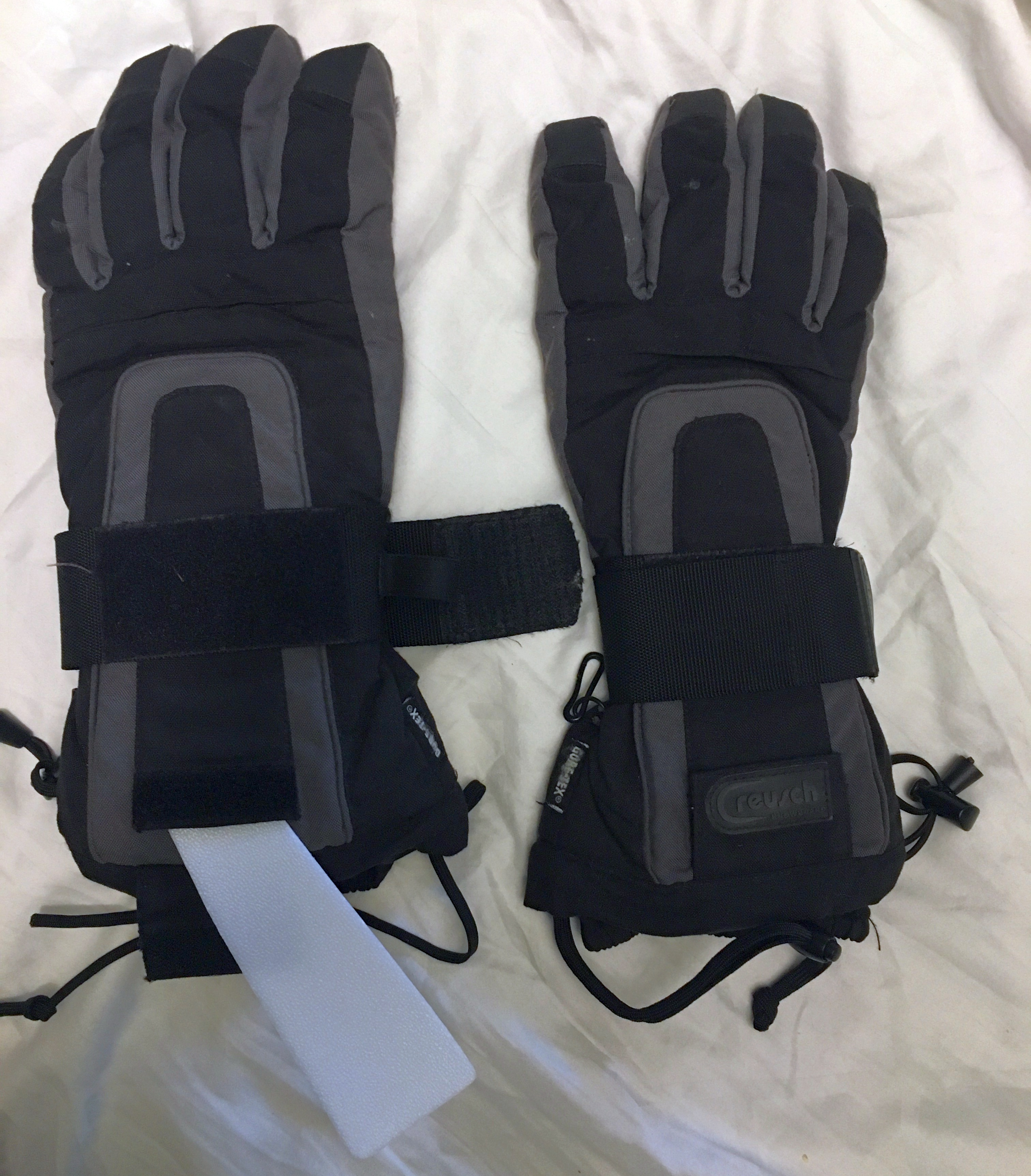
Snowboarding gloves with an integrated plastic element as a wrist guard, seen partially pulled out on left. Together with a tight bandage-like strap (middle), the wrist is supported and stabilized upon impact onto the ground when falling.

- Gloves are available to protect against:
  - Chemicals, contamination and infection (e.g. disposable latex/vinyl/nitrile gloves)
  - Electricity, when voltage is too high
  - Extremes of temperature (e.g. oven gloves, welder's gloves)
  - Mechanical hazards (e.g. rigger gloves, chainmail gloves)
  - Mechanic gloves prime concern is to protect hands against mechanical type of applications, where harsh elements of mechanical work is directly detecting your hands required to be secured against the highest or lowest levels of risks depending upon the working environment which is normally measured in terms of different rating standards specifying the class of gloves.
  - Lacerations and other wounds from sharp objects
- Baseball glove
- Belay gloves
- Cycling gloves
- Falconry gloves
- Gymnastics grips
- Hand guards
- Hand/wrist wraps
- Hockey glove
- Wicket-keeper's gloves

=== Body protection ===
- Athletic supporter with cup pocket and protective cup, also called Abdomen guard or cricket box
- Chestguard (Chest guard, Hogu)
- Rib guard

=== Foot/Leg/hip protection ===
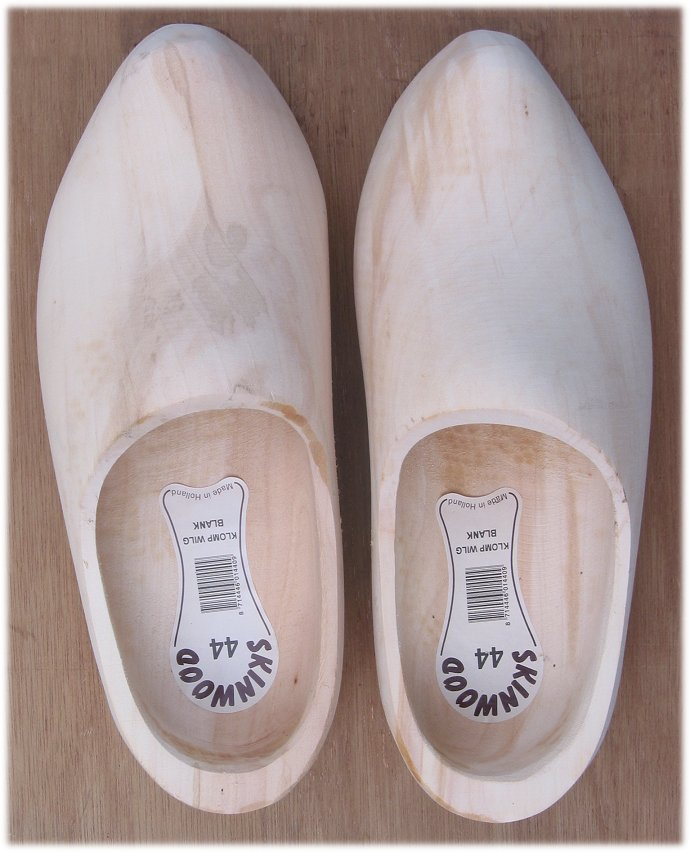
clogs

- Foot guard
- Hip pads (Hip pad)
- Knee pads
- Instep guard/instep protector
- Shin guard (shin guards)
- Combined knee-shin guards
- Padded shorts
- Bouldering mat
- Chaps are individual pant leggings made of leather and worn by farriers, cowboys, and rodeo contestants to protect the legs from contact with hooves, thorny undergrowth, and other such work hazards. May also be made of other materials for leg protection against other hazards, such as "rain chaps" of waterproof materials, or "saw chaps" of Kevlar for chainsaw workers.
- Safety footwear & Protective footwear is footwear that comes with a protective toe cap.

== Full protective garments ==
Protective suit is an umbrella term for any suit or clothing which protects the wearer. Any specific design of suit may offer protection against biological and chemical agents, particle radiation (alpha) and/or radiation (delta and gamma), and may offer flash protection in the case of bomb disposal suits. Most forms of industrial clothing are protective clothing. Personal protective equipment includes:

=== Complete suits ===
The word "chemsuit" is sometimes used to mean a real chemical-protection suit, as well as fictional.

- Boilersuit
- NBC suit
- Hazmat suit
- Bombsuits
- Fire proximity suit
- Riding suits (abrasion-proof: made of leather, kevlar, ballistic nylon, cordura, etc., and waterproof)
- Spacesuit
- Splash suit, to protect against splashing chemicals
- Wetsuit and Drysuit
- Immersion suit

=== Other garments ===
- Apron (protects the body and other clothing from dirt) (also used as distinction by waiters)
- Nappy ("diaper" in American English)
- Motorcycle armor
- Protective vest
- Safety harness
- Sun protective clothing

== PPE for Aramco Approved Projects ==
Aramco-approved projects require certified PPE including hard hats, safety glasses, gloves, safety footwear, high-visibility clothing, respiratory protection, and fall protection. All equipment must meet recognized international standards and match site-specific hazards.
