= Hand guard =

Device worn by athletes in artistic gymnastics

Hand guards are devices worn by athletes in artistic gymnastics. Gymnasts use various types of hand guards:

- Grips are used on the uneven bars, high bar, still rings and parallel bars to enhance the gymnast's grip and, in the case of bar exercises, to reduce friction between the gymnast's hands and the bar.
