= Giant (gymnastics) =

Artistic gymnastics skill

A giant is an artistic gymnastics skill in which a gymnast rotates 360 degrees around an axis while in a fully extended position. It is performed on the uneven bars in women's artistic gymnastics and on the parallel bars, horizontal bar, and rings in men's artistic gymnastics.

== Technique ==
To achieve the giant a gymnast must get enough momentum to go over the bar, usually achieved with a cast to handstand. With legs together, toes pointed, and body fully extended, the feet begin to descend. The upper body is hollows until the gymnast passes through directly under the bar where the gymnast arches slightly, then goes back to hollow in a kicking motion. On the upswing, the abdominal muscles are engaged to slightly arch the body and prevent anterior pelvic tilt, which adversely affects the strength of the swing. The gymnast either returns to the handstand position or continues through handstand to perform another giant or other element.

The men’s high bar and rings giants are done with legs fully extended and toes pointed at all times. On the men’s parallel bars, knee bend may be required due to bar height. The female’s uneven bars may require bending knees or opening up their feet slightly to avoid hitting the lower bar.

== Variations ==
Some variations on the standard giant include:

- Forward or front giant - Performed with palms turned inward to face the body and heels leading the down swing instead of the front of the foot.
- Inverted, Eagle-Grip, or L-Grip giant - Performed like a forward giant but with the palms turned outward (L-Grip) to face the body
- Mixed grip giant - Performed as either a regular or forward giant with the hands held in two different grips (e.g. one hand in L-Grip, one hand in normal grip)
- One arm giant - Performed with only one arm holding the bar instead of two
- German giant - Performed with palms facing away from the gymnast's body and shoulders rotated backwards
- 3/4 giant - Performed starting in front support and casting to parallel then back down and around the bar to the front support position once again
- Skoumal giant -Performed as a back giant with the shoulders rotated forward as if doing an "inlocate" on rings. Essentially like a Manna over the top of the bar.

== Scoring ==
In the current Federation Internationale de Gymnastique (FIG) 2017-2020 Code of Points, a giant is a B (0.2) element on uneven bars for women, and a B (0.2) element on parallel bars and an A (0.1) element on the horizontal bar for men.
