= Parallel bars =

Apparatus used in artistic gymnastics

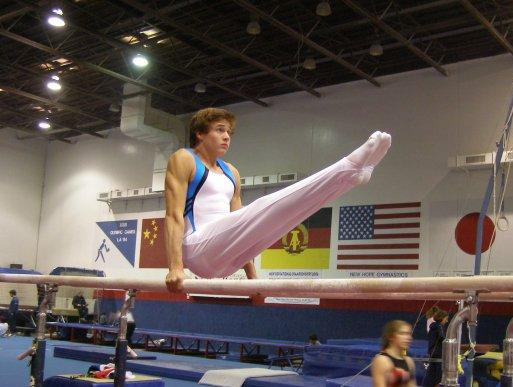
A gymnast performs on the parallel bars

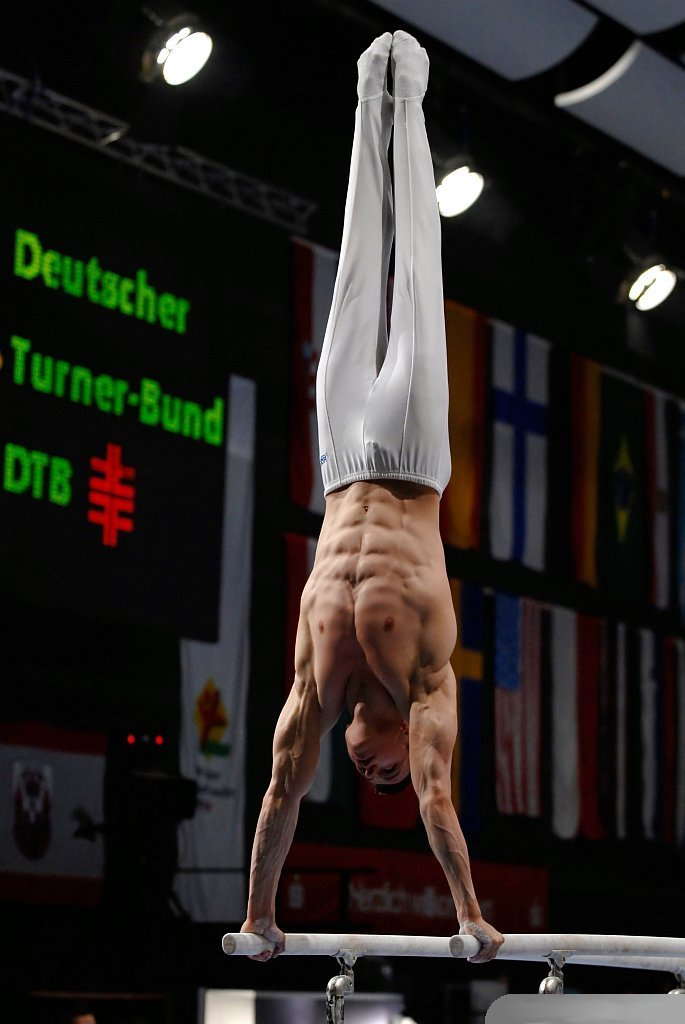
A handstand

Parallel bars are floor apparatus consisting of two wooden bars approximately 350 centimetres (11 feet 6 inches) long and positioned at 200 cm (6 ft 7 in) above the floor. Parallel bars are used in artistic gymnastics and also for physical therapy and home exercise. Gymnasts may optionally wear grips when performing a routine on the parallel bars, although this is uncommon.

== Apparatus ==
The apparatus consists of two parallel bars that are held parallel to, and elevated above, the floor by a metal supporting framework. The bars must be elastic and stable, and the surface of the bars must be made of wood or a similar material. Modern bars are typically made of two ash rails reinforced inside with fiberglass. The vertical members of the supporting framework are adjustable so the height of the bars above the floor and distance between the bars can be set optimally for each gymnast.

=== Dimensions ===
The bars must have the following dimensions:

- Bar length: 350 centimetres (11.5 ft) ± 1 centimetre (0.39 in)
- Bar rounded profile: 5 cm (1 31/32 in) ± 1 millimetre (0.039 in) vertical by 4 centimetres (1.6 in) ± 1 millimetre (0.039 in) horizontal
- Height of bar from floor: 200 centimetres (6.6 ft) ± 1 centimetre (0.39 in)
- Distance between bars: 42 to 52 centimetres (17 to 20 in) (adjustable)

== History ==
Johann Christoph Friedrich GutsMuths created an apparatus with bars and beams, though the first edition of his book, Gymnastics for the Youth (German: Gymnastik für die Jugend), published in 1793, did not include drawings of parallel bars. A later edition published in 1847 did. Another early German gymnast named Friedrich Ludwig Jahn is considered to be the inventor of the parallel bars. He created the first known set of parallel bars, based on the vaulting horse with extended handles and no body between them, and installed them in his open-air gymnastics exercise ground, which opened in Berlin in 1811. At the time, they were meant to strengthen the arms for exercises on the vaulting horse, then a substitute for exercises on a real horse.

Jahn later came into conflict with Hugo Rothstein, a proponent of Swedish gymnastics, over the use of the bars. Rothstein, director of the Central Gymnastics Institute founded in 1851, removed both the parallel bar and the horizontal bar from German gymnastics curricula. Emil Heinrich du Bois-Reymond, a German professor of physiology, recommended returning the parallel bars to German gymnastics. They were reinstated into curricula in 1862 or 1863.

The first parallel bars could not be adjusted and were bolted into the ground. They sometimes had three bars, particularly in schools focused on health care. In 1819 the first transportable parallel bars were created by a Swiss educator, Phokion Heinrich Clias. However, they were not very popular. Later, Hermann Otto Kluge, a pharmacists, created adjustable bars that used tubes, which he used in his own gym, built in 1856. Others developed new models that emphasized ease of adjustment as well as safety.

In the 1920s, the bars were shorter than modern bars, with their height adjustable from 120 centimetres (3.9 ft) to 170 centimetres (5.6 ft), and up to 3 metres (9.8 ft) long. Various types of bars were available, and exercises easily performed on one set of bars might be impossible on another. Bars made out of wood frequently became damaged and cracked; at the 1952 Summer Olympics, the bars cracked four times. Richard Reuther proposed a new design in 1953 that included elasticity, and he introduced his new type of bars two years later. They could also be adjusted slightly taller and were longer at 3.5 metres (11 ft) long. In 1963, Reuther incorporated fiberglass into the bars, which significantly improved both the flexibility and the durability in the bars; only minor changes have been made in their construction since.

== Routines ==
Routines involve swinging both backward and forward, static holds, turns in handstand positions, and somersaults performed while between the bars. Each routine ends with a dismount from either the end or the side of the bars.

=== International level routines ===
The gymnast must mount the bars by jumping from both feet; a springboard may be used. A routine should contain at least one element from all element groups:

- I. Elements in support or through support on both bars
- II. Elements starting in the upper arm position
- III. Long swings in hang, on 1 or 2 bars, and underswings
- IV. Dismounts

=== Scoring and rules ===
Deductions are taken for lack of form and precision of elements performed. There are specific deductions for adjusting the hand position in the handstand and not controlling swing elements; many swing type elements should momentarily show handstand.

== See also ==
- Parallettes
