= Ankle brace =

Medical support worn around the ankle

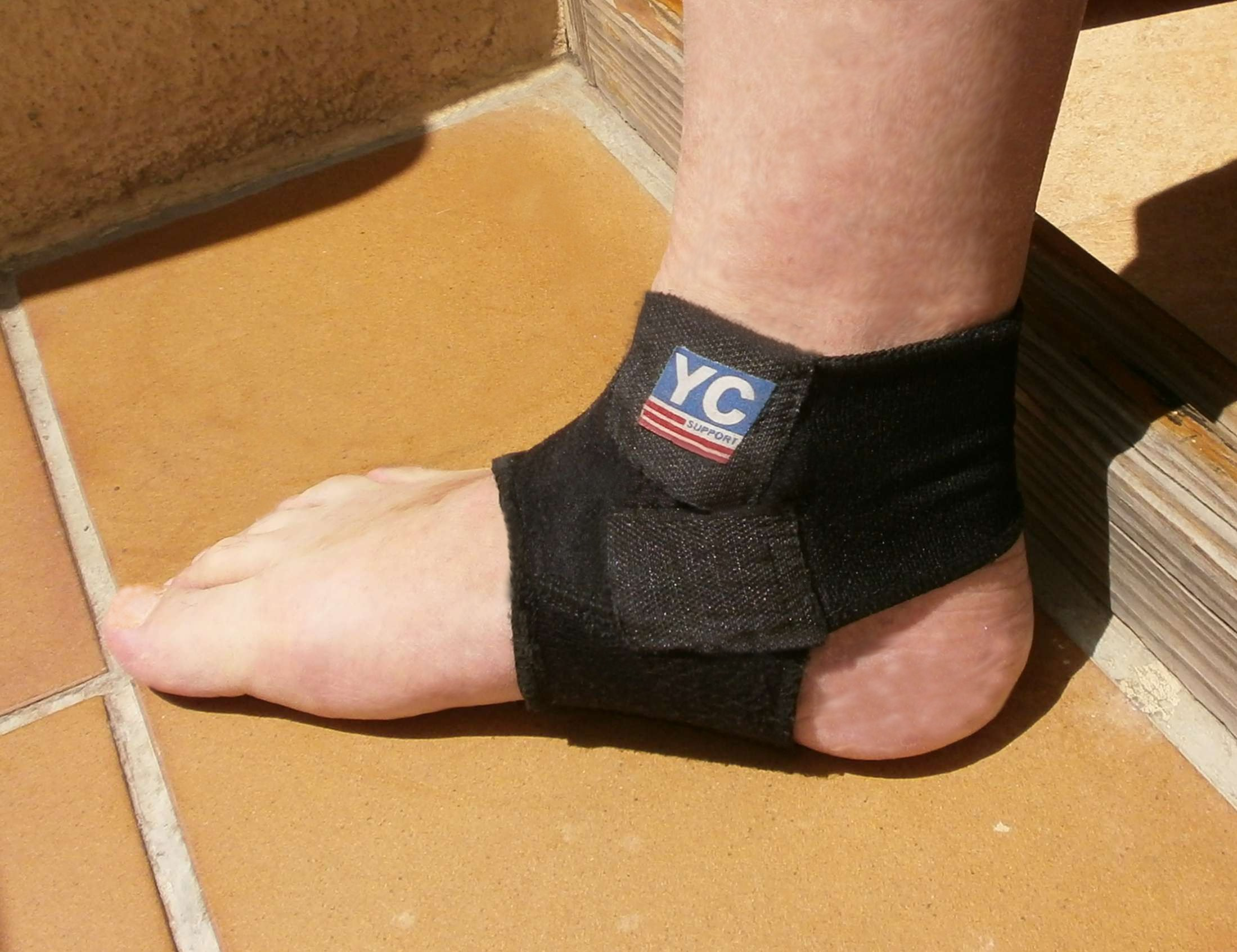
ankle brace

An ankle brace is a garment that is worn around the ankle to protect it or for immobilization while allowing it to heal from sprains and other minor injuries. Ankle braces are used to immobilize the joint while providing heat and compression to the bones. They are common in injury rehabilitation processes that affect the ankle, being made of rigid fabric such nylon and neoprene that allow limited mobility of the foot and conform to the ankle by a hook and loop fastener. To ensure its fixation, the foot portion may include metal pieces. In severe cases, they incorporate metallic plates to better immobilize the joint. Ankle braces may not be adequate in treating more severe sprains and ankle injuries.

== Indications ==
Ankle braces are indicated for ankle trauma with small fractures or without fracture, immobilization of the joint, postoperative synovitis, sprains or inflammations of the joint, weak muscles in the ankle, among others.

In rehabilitation ankle braces are used to immobilize the ankle in a neutral position, which "theoretically minimizes stress at the repair site". Finally, are used in sports where the ankle is under stress, as in soccer, rugby or basketball.

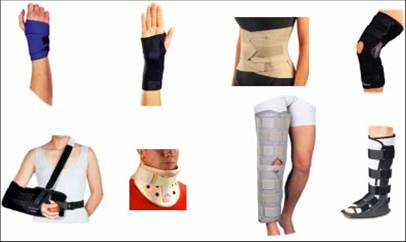
Various orthotic devices

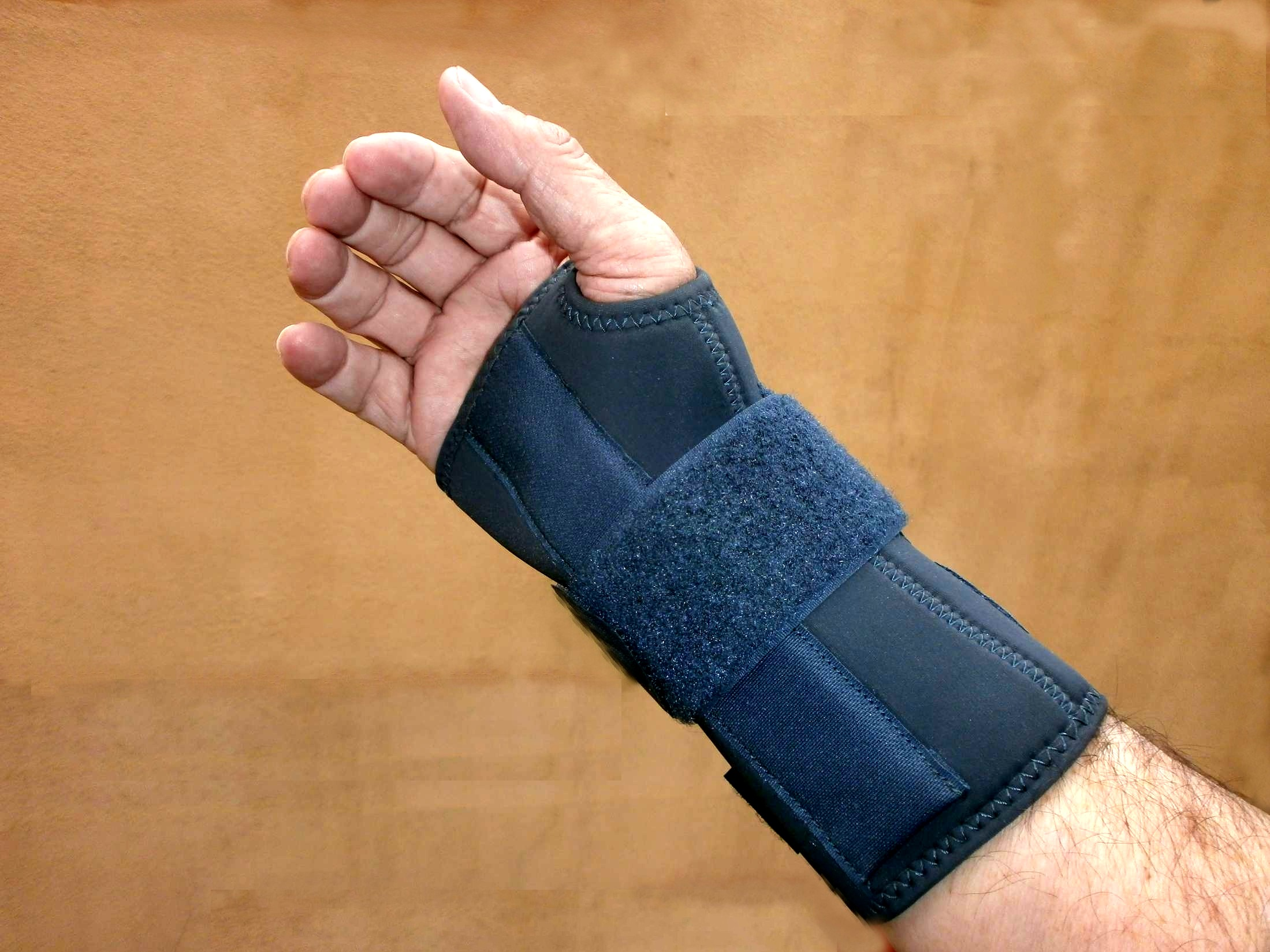
Wrist brace

== See also ==
- Sprain
- Twisted ankle
- Wrist pain
- Swelling
- Arthritis
- Tendonitis
- Wrist guard
