= Wrist guard =

Sports wrist protection device

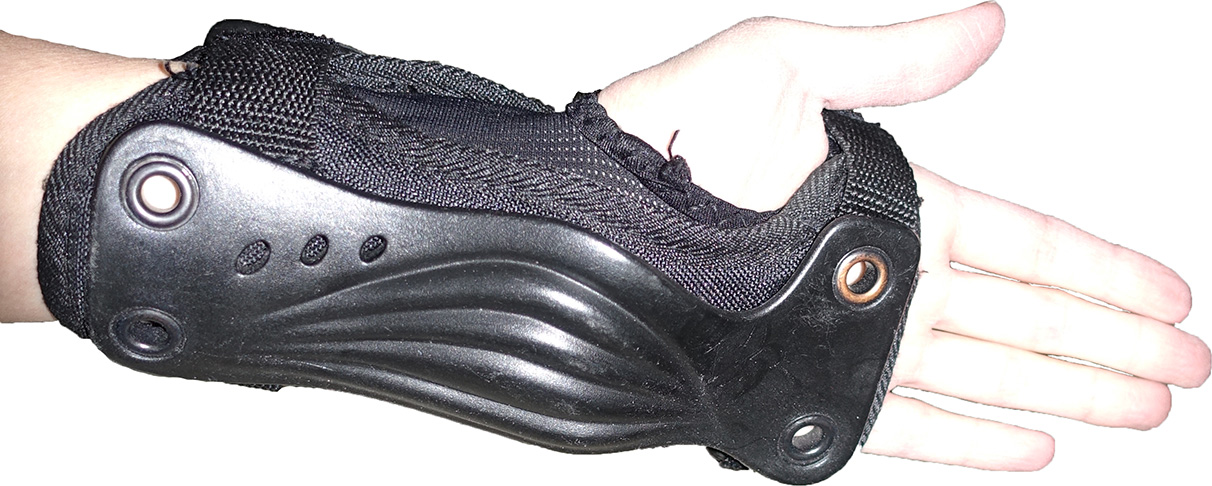
An adult-size wrist-guard whose hard plastic splint is six inches long, which enables the forearm and palm to absorb the impact of a fast fall.

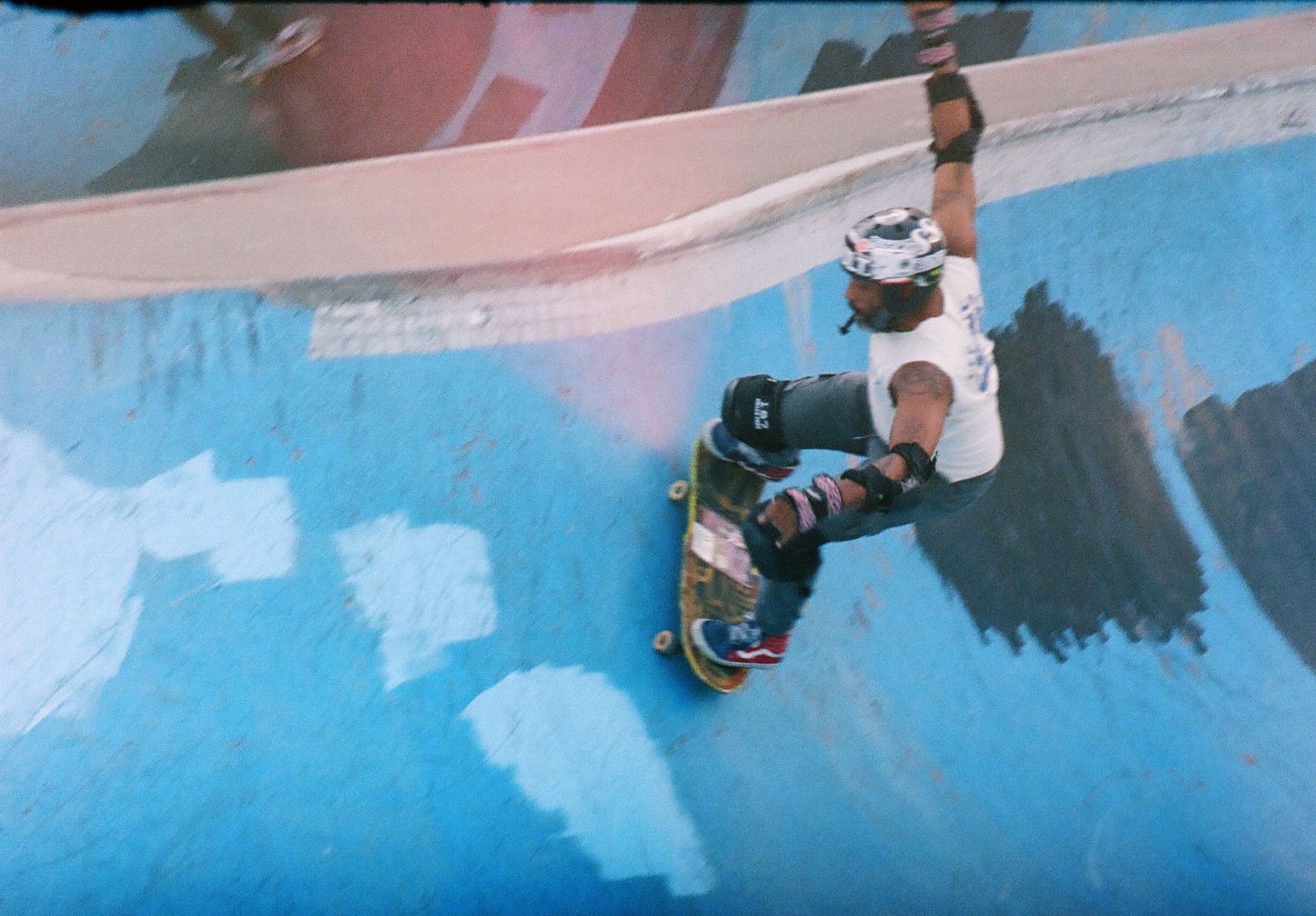
Jon Nicholson carves the bowl at Millennium Skate Park - October 2019

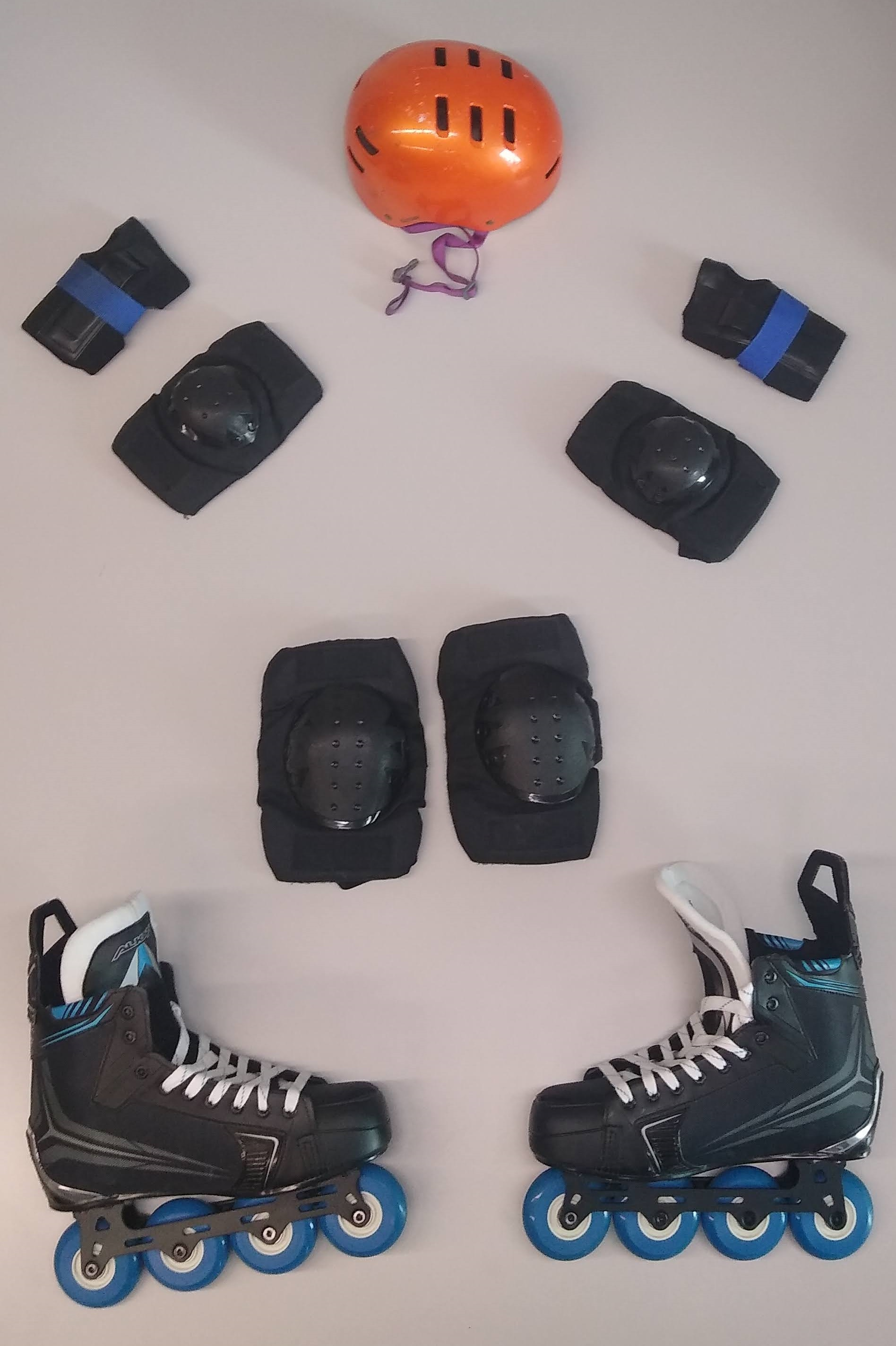
Typical In-line skating protective gear includes helmet, elbow pads, wrist guards, and knee pads.

A wrist-guard is a device to protect the wrist from sport injuries. Wrist-guards are sold in skateboard, snowboard and sporting goods stores. They are worn also by people using a balance board.

== Purpose ==
The purpose of a wrist guard is to prevent the wearer from injuring their wrist or arm when falling. When a person falls forward, the typical reflex is to stretch their hands out in front of them to break the fall. In particularly violent or fast falls that are often associated with extreme sports, the forces associated with the fall can be large enough to cause severe bruising, dislocation or fracture of the wrist and arm bones. Wrist-guards prevent such injury with a plastic splint held on the inside of the wrist. The splint curves inwards towards the palm at the wrist joint, where it is exposed, and is concealed and held in place by padding at the hand and arm. When the wearer falls forward onto their hands, the curved plastic splint prevents the hand from hitting the ground, and the reduced friction of the plastic deflects the hands forward. Because of this reduced friction and forward deflection of the force of the fall, no weight can be put on the arm that is sufficient to cause any injury without the arm simply sliding forward. Although wrist guards can prevent arm injury, they have no effect on injuries to the shoulder, and dislocation or fracture is still possible, if not more likely due to the arm being thrown outwards.

== Disadvantages ==
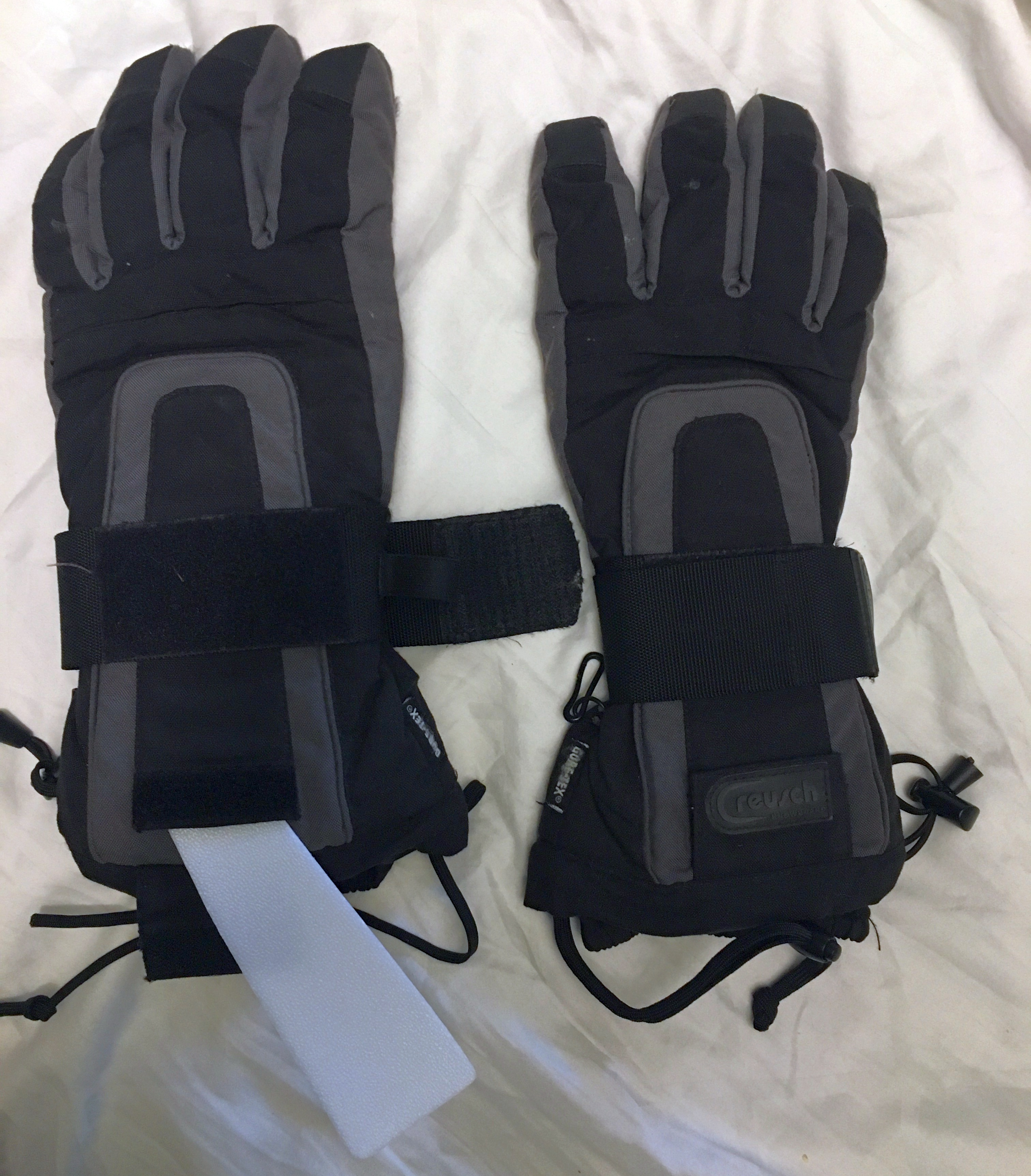
Snowboarding gloves with an integrated plastic element, seen left partially pulled out. The element is pressed tightly to the wrist with a wide, all-around velcro-fastened strap, which can be seen in loose state on the left and tightened on the right glove.

Because the force of the fall has to impact upon some part of the body, wrist guards increase the chance of facial or head injuries because the arms cannot support the upper body on impact. Additionally, if the fingers are held in a loose fist upon impact or are folded towards the palm they can catch on the ground during a fall, causing severe grazing to the knuckles. If the fall is particularly steep, because the wrist guard ends just below the base of the fingers, the first set of knuckles is at risk of injury by being bent back over the wrist-guard.

== See also ==
- Stone wrist-guard
- Hand guard
- Usage of personal protective equipment
- Ankle brace
- Wrist brace
