= Rings (gymnastics) =

Artistic gymnastics apparatus

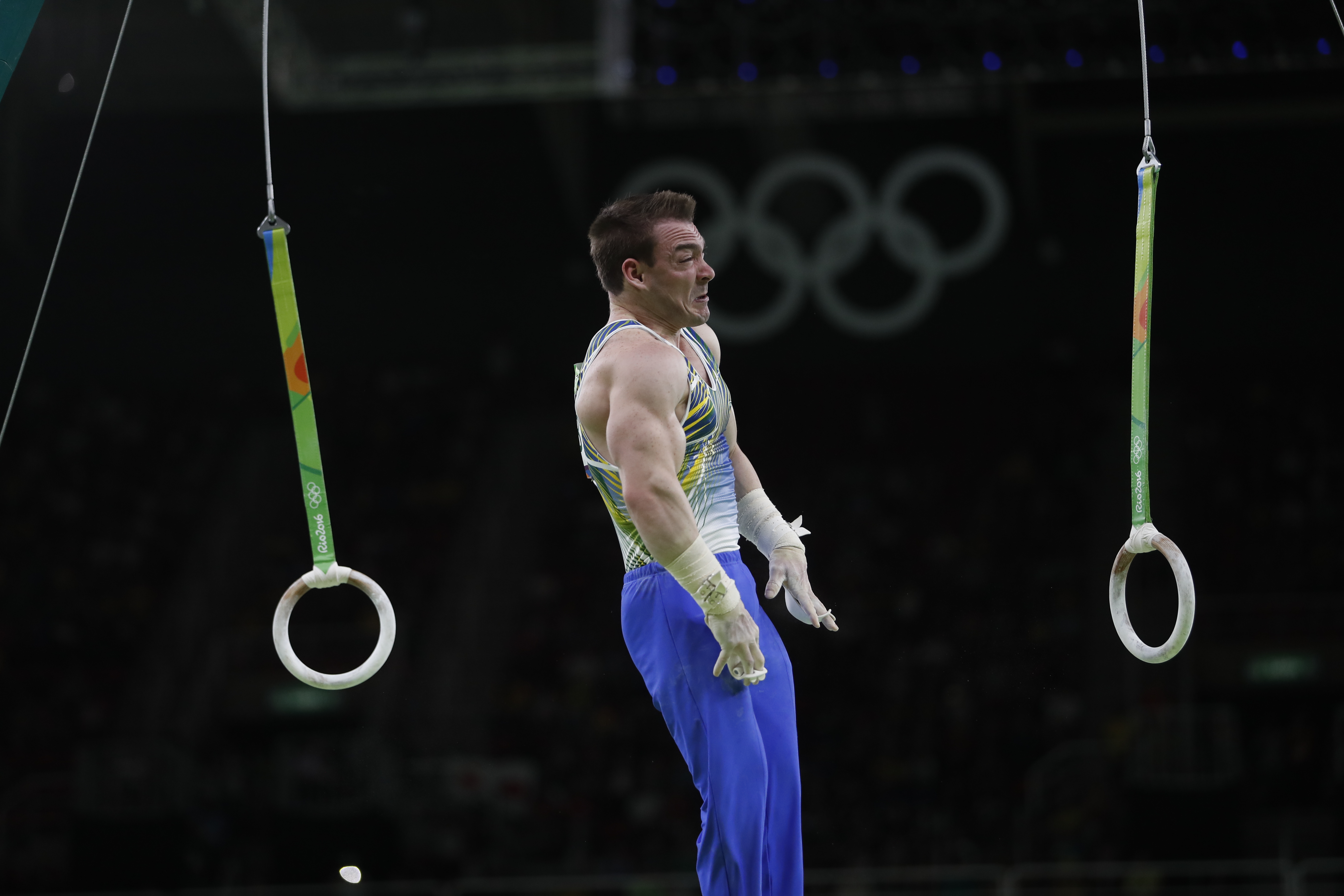
Arthur Zanetti dismounting from the rings at the 2016 Olympics

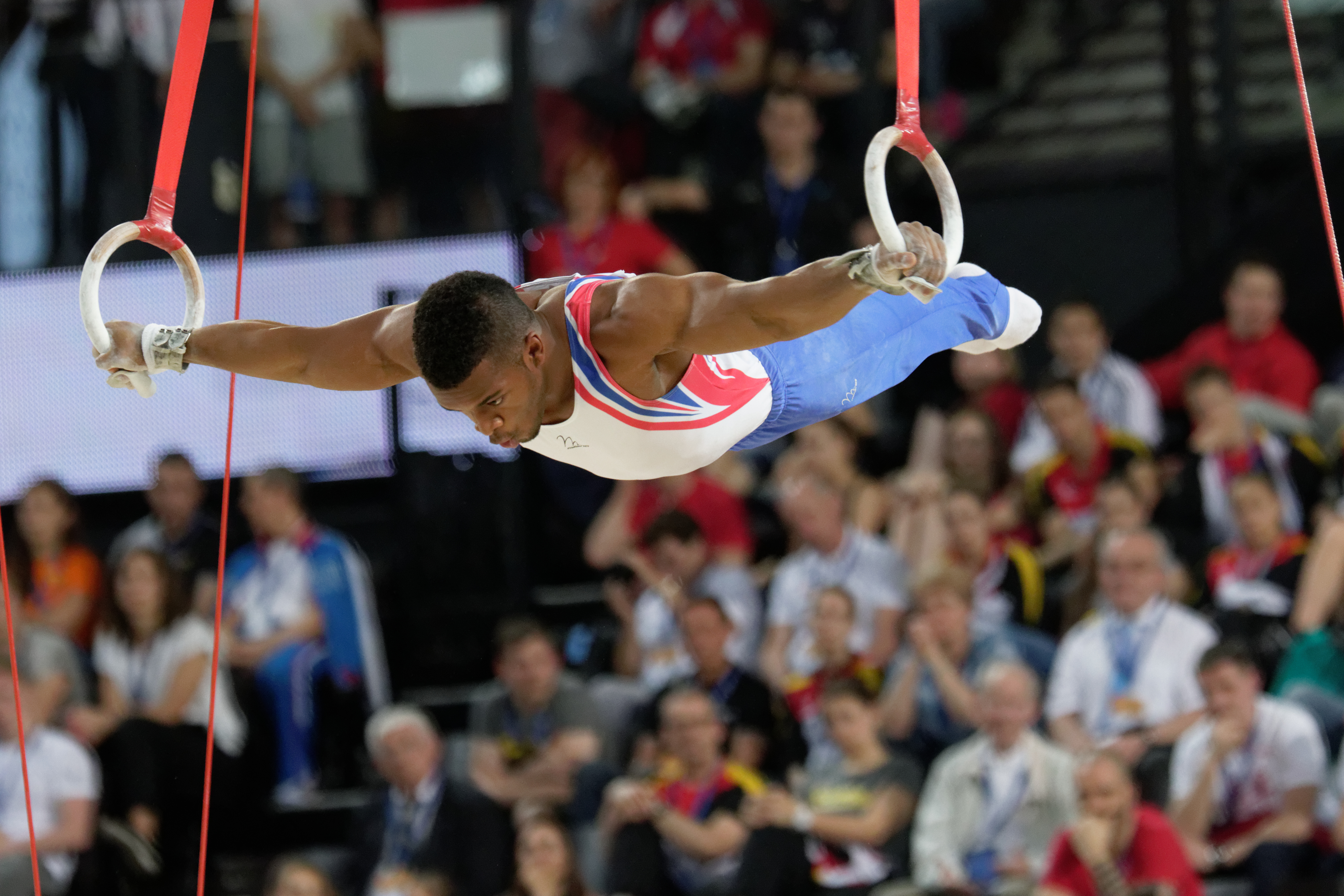
Courtney Tulloch competing at the 2015 European Artistic Gymnastics Championships

The rings, also known as still rings (in contrast to flying rings), is an artistic gymnastics apparatus and the event that uses it. It is traditionally used only by male gymnasts due to its extreme upper body strength requirements. Gymnasts often wear ring grips while performing.

== Apparatus ==
The apparatus consists of two rings that hang freely from a rigid metal frame. Each ring is supported by a strap, which connects to a steel cable suspended from the metal frame. The gymnast, who grips one ring with each hand, must control the movement of the rings and their body movements at all times.

=== Dimensions ===
The measurements of the standard apparatus are specified by Fédération internationale de gymnastique (FIG) in its Apparatus Norms document:

- Inner diameter: 18 centimetres (7.1 in) ± 0.1 centimetres (0.039 in)
- Diameter of profile: 2.8 centimetres (1.1 in) ± 0.1 centimetres (0.039 in)
- Distance from the point of attachment to the lower inner side of the rings: 300 centimetres (9.8 ft) ± 1 centimetre (0.39 in)
- Distance between two points of attachment: 50 centimetres (1.6 ft) ± 0.5 centimetres (0.20 in)

== Routines ==
An exercise on rings consists of swing, strength, and hold elements. Generally, gymnasts are required to fulfill various requirements, including a swing to hold handstand, a static strength hold, and an aerial dismount. More experienced gymnasts often perform more than one strength element, sometimes swinging into hold positions or performing different holds consecutively.

One of the most widely recognized skills performed on the rings is the Iron Cross, which is executed by extending both arms straight out from the sides of the body while suspended mid-air for at least two seconds. Other common strength moves include the inverted cross (i.e., vertically inverted Iron Cross) and the Maltese cross, in which the gymnast holds their body parallel to the ground at ring height with arms extended laterally. Swing elements include giant swings from handstand to handstand, in both front and back directions, similar to giants performed on the horizontal bar. Elements on the rings are regulated by the Code of Points.

=== International level routines ===
A rings routine should contain at least one element from all element groups:

- I. Kip and swing elements & swings through or to handstand
- II. Strength elements and hold elements
- III. Swings to strength hold elements
- IV. Dismounts

=== Scoring and rules ===
Gymnasts will take deductions for form similar to other apparatus. On rings, gymnasts will also take deductions for having bent arms while performing nearly all elements or using the straps/cables to support or balance themselves. Additional deductions are applied to gymnasts unable to maintain a neutral head position during holds, a neutral face (not grimacing), or grunting. There are also deductions for each extraneous swinging of the cables during the routine. Bonus points on the still rings are earned by performing consecutive distinct static hold elements based upon the letter value of both moves, listed in the code of points.

== See also ==
- List of gymnasts specializing in rings
