= Hugo Rothstein =

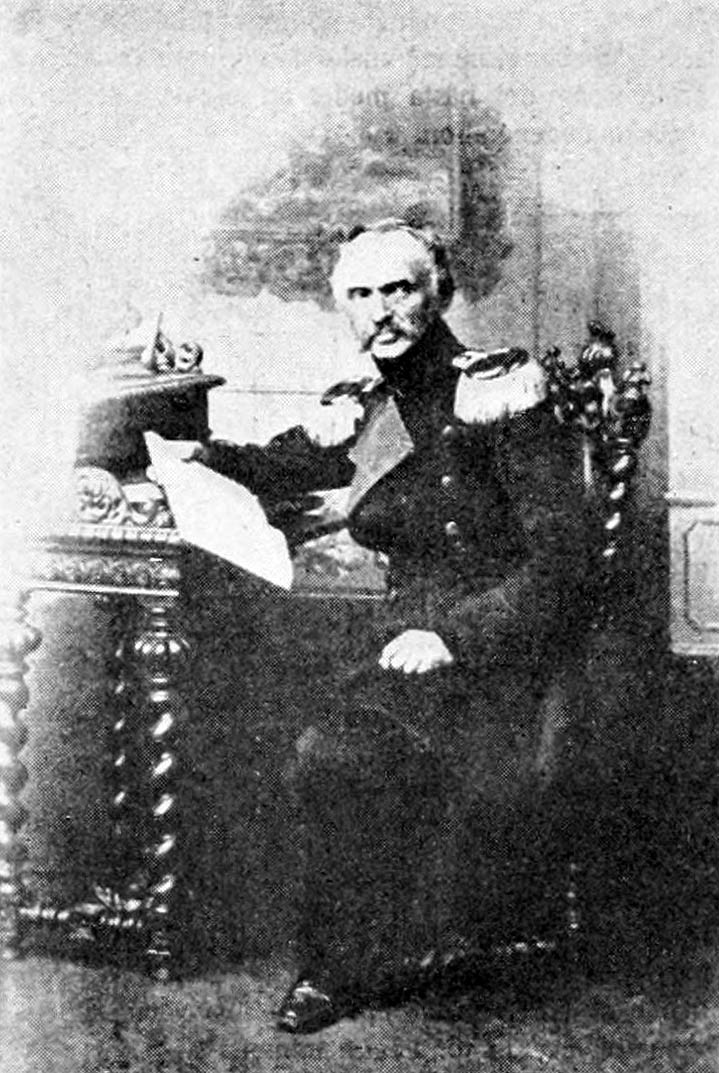

Hugo Rothstein (28 August 1810 Erfurt - 28 March 1865 Erfurt) was a Prussian officer, writer, educator and gymnast. He traveled to Sweden to investigate Swedish gymnastics, and introduced it into Prussian military and civil physical training programs. He was a severe critic of the Turners and their German system of gymnastics.
