= Wrist brace =

Supportive garment to protect against strains and splains, or as a splint

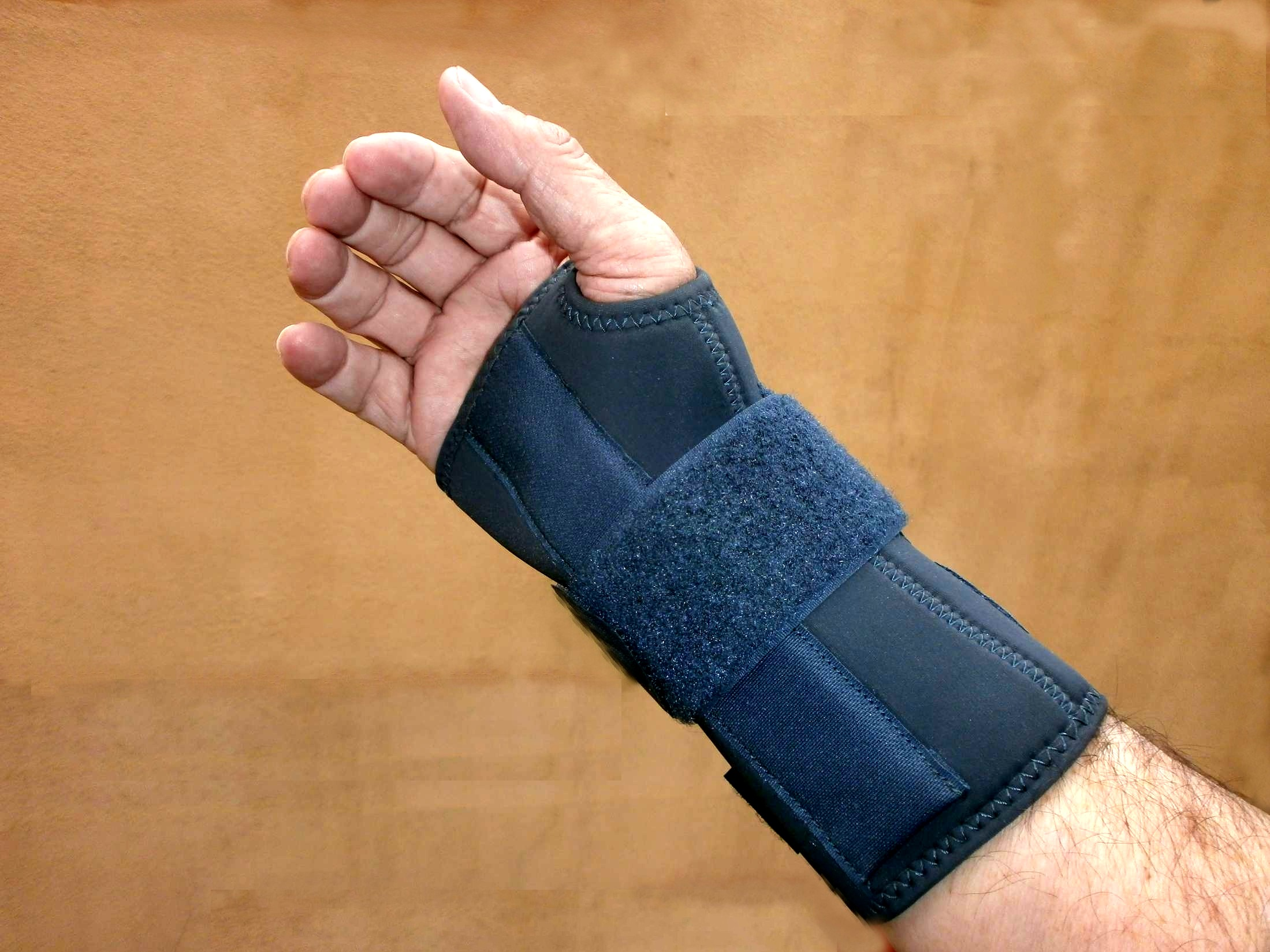
Wrist brace used in orthopedics

A wrist brace is a supportive garment worn around the wrist to reinforce and protect it against strains and sprains during strong use, or as a splint to help healing. Wrist braces are common accessories in injury rehabilitation processes involving the wrist. They immobilize the joint and provide heat and compression to the wrist bones and ligaments. Currently, they are made with a rigid tissue nylon fabrics or neoprene that allows limited mobility of the hand and wrist and are usually fixed with Velcro, some times with extensions to ensure they cover part of the hand adhering around thumb. In severe cases, they incorporate metal "spines" to better immobilize the joint.

== Uses ==
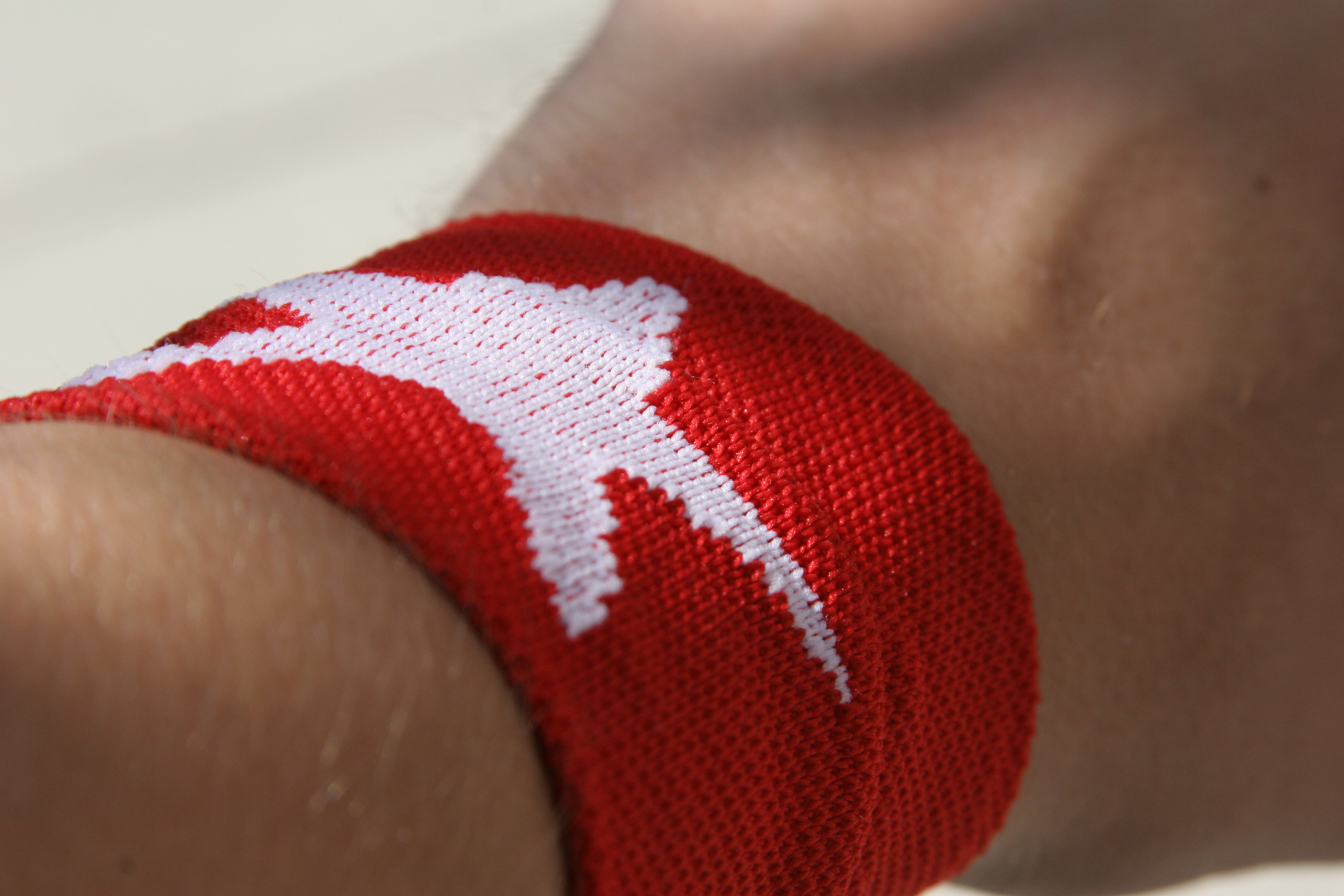
Wrist brace used in sports

They are indicated for wrist trauma with and without fracture, immobilization of the joint, postoperative synovitis, recurrent degenerative sprains or articulation inflammations, among many other cases.

In rehabilitation to immobilize the wrist into a neutral position, which "theoretically minimizes stress at the repair site".

== Use in sports ==
The wrist braces have a protective role in activities where wrists require extraordinary effort like weight lifting or bodybuilding. In these cases, using pressure around the wrist may prevent sprains and strains.

Finally, are used in sports which force the wrist play, as those played with a paddle or racket (tennis, paddle, badminton) or hockey. Some times they have a double purpose: protect the wrist from injuries and wipe the sweat from the forehead. For this purpose they are made in absorbent materials such as cotton or plush.

In artistic gymnastics, gymnasts will sometimes wear wrist guards to absorb the impact on the skills they perform. The guards are commonly worn for Vaulting and Floor exercises. The design is modified between women and men.

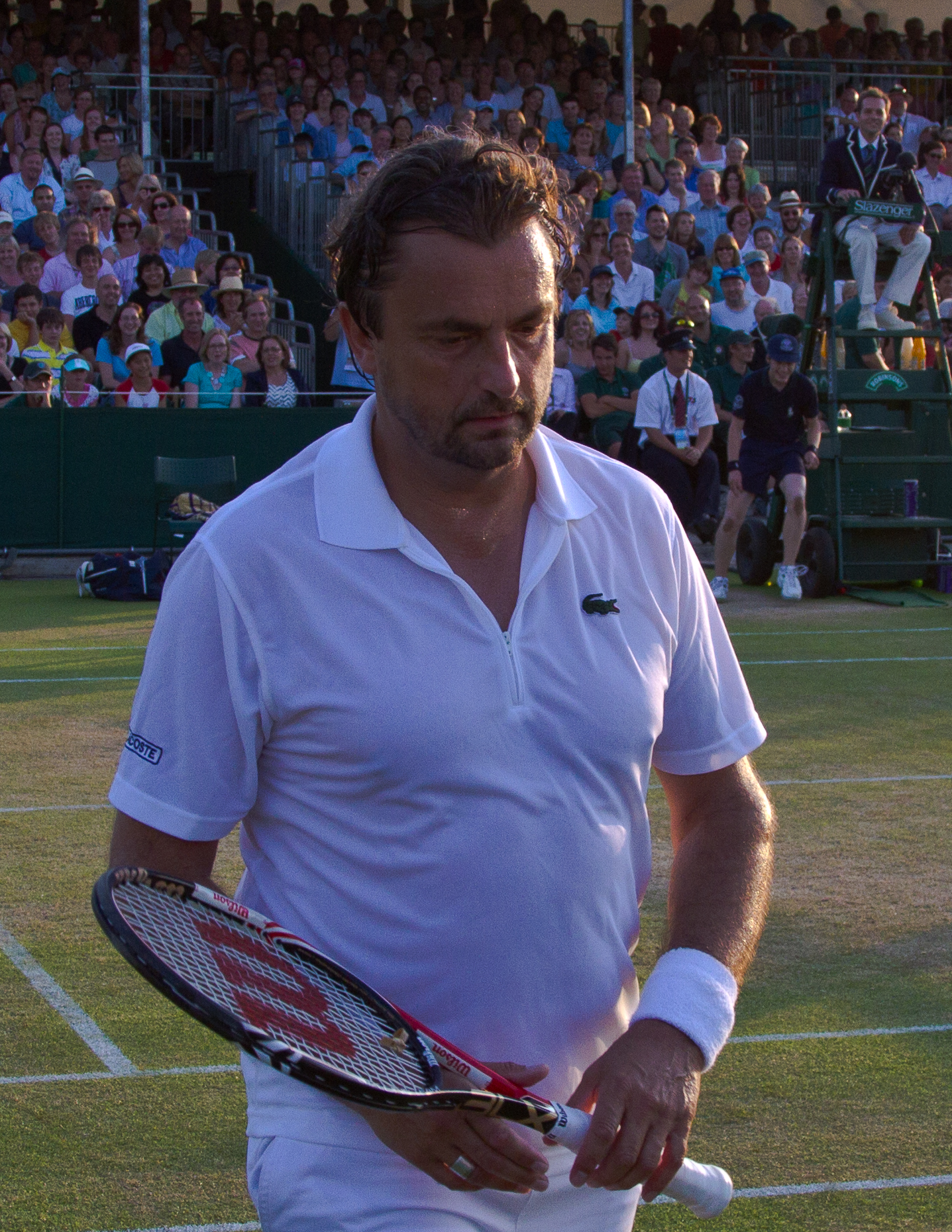
Tennis Player with wrist brace

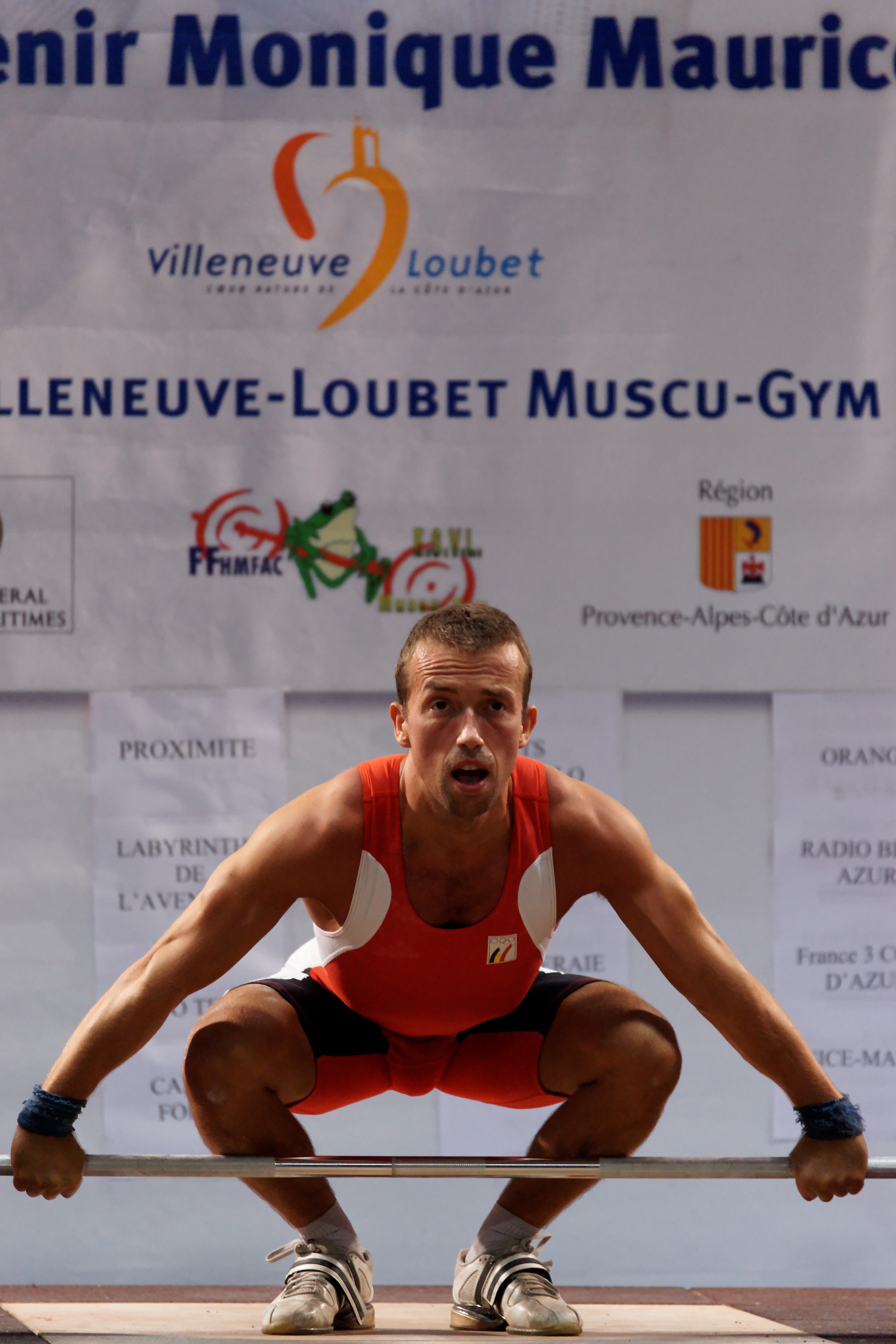
Weight lifter with wrist brace

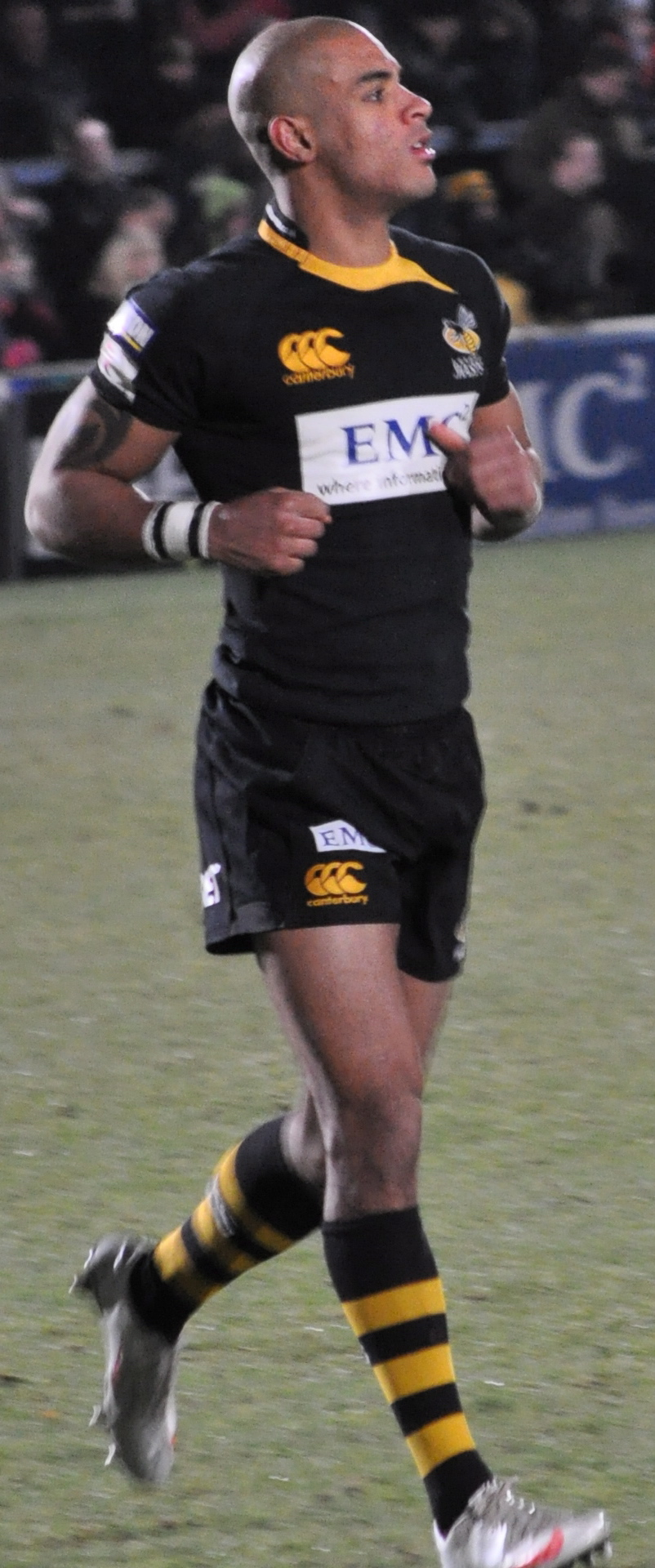
Rugby player with wrist brace

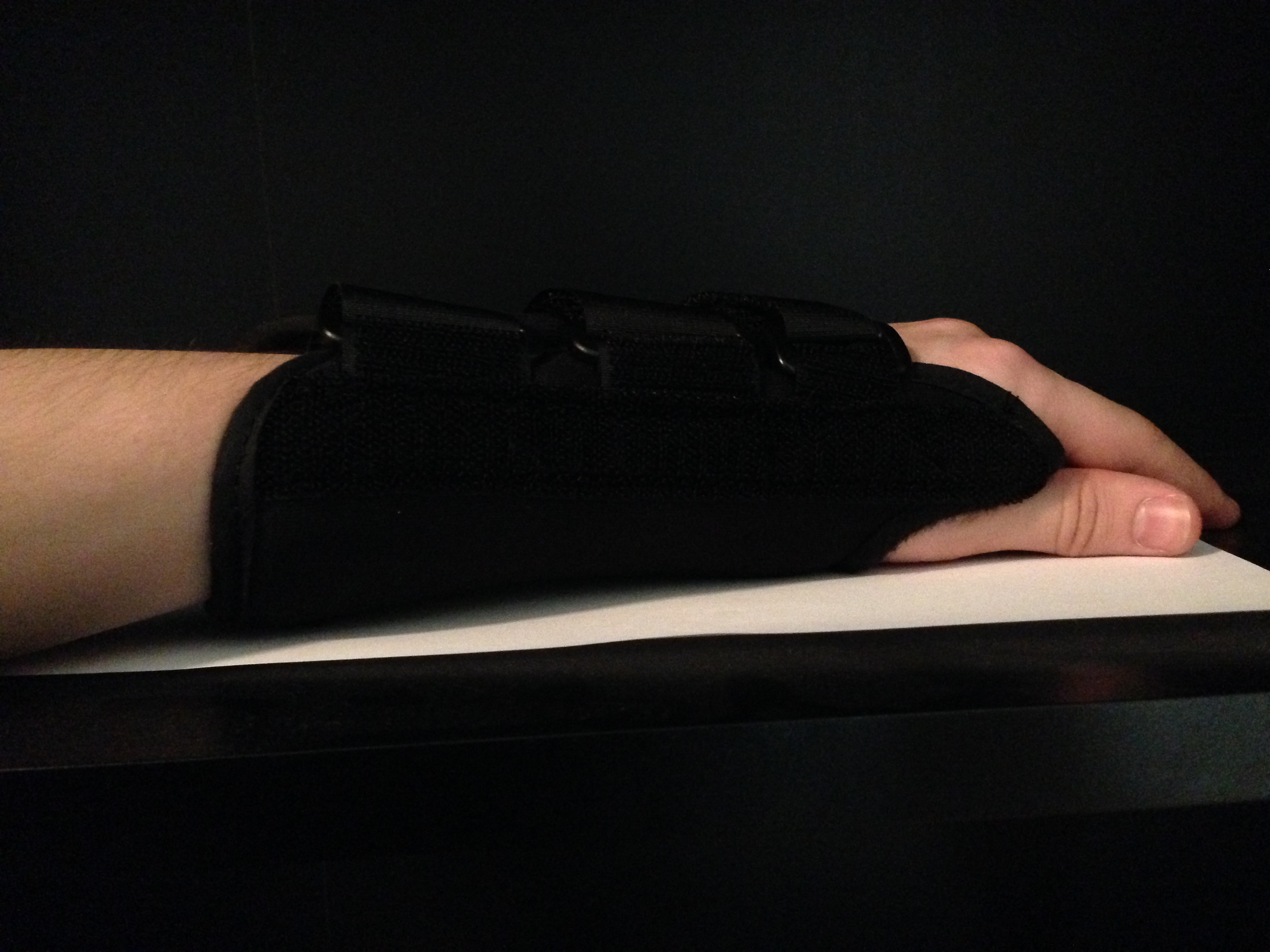
Wrist brace

== See also ==
- Ankle brace
- Open wrist
- Wristband
- Wrist guard
