= Wristlet =

Wristlet may refer to:

- Wristlet, a small handbag with a short carrying strap resembling a bracelet
- Wristwatch, originally known as a wristlet when the vast majority of personal timepieces were pocket watches
- Trench watch, a transitional design between the pocket watch and the wristwatch used by the military during World War I
- Lady Churchill's Rosebud Wristlet, a twice-yearly zine published by Small Beer Press
