= List of gymnasts specializing in rings =

List of gymnasts who specialize in the stationary rings event:

- Albert Azaryan, Olympic gold medalist at the 1956 Summer Olympics and at the 1960 Summer Olympics
- Arthur Zanetti, Olympic gold medalist at the 2012 Summer Olympics
- Chen Yibing, Olympic gold medalist at the 2008 Summer Olympics
- Eleftherios Petrounias, Olympic gold medalist at the 2016 Summer Olympics
- Jury Chechi, Olympic gold medalist at the 1996 Summer Olympics
- Yordan Yovchev
- Yuri van Gelder
