= Grip (gymnastics) =

Hand protector worn by gymnasts

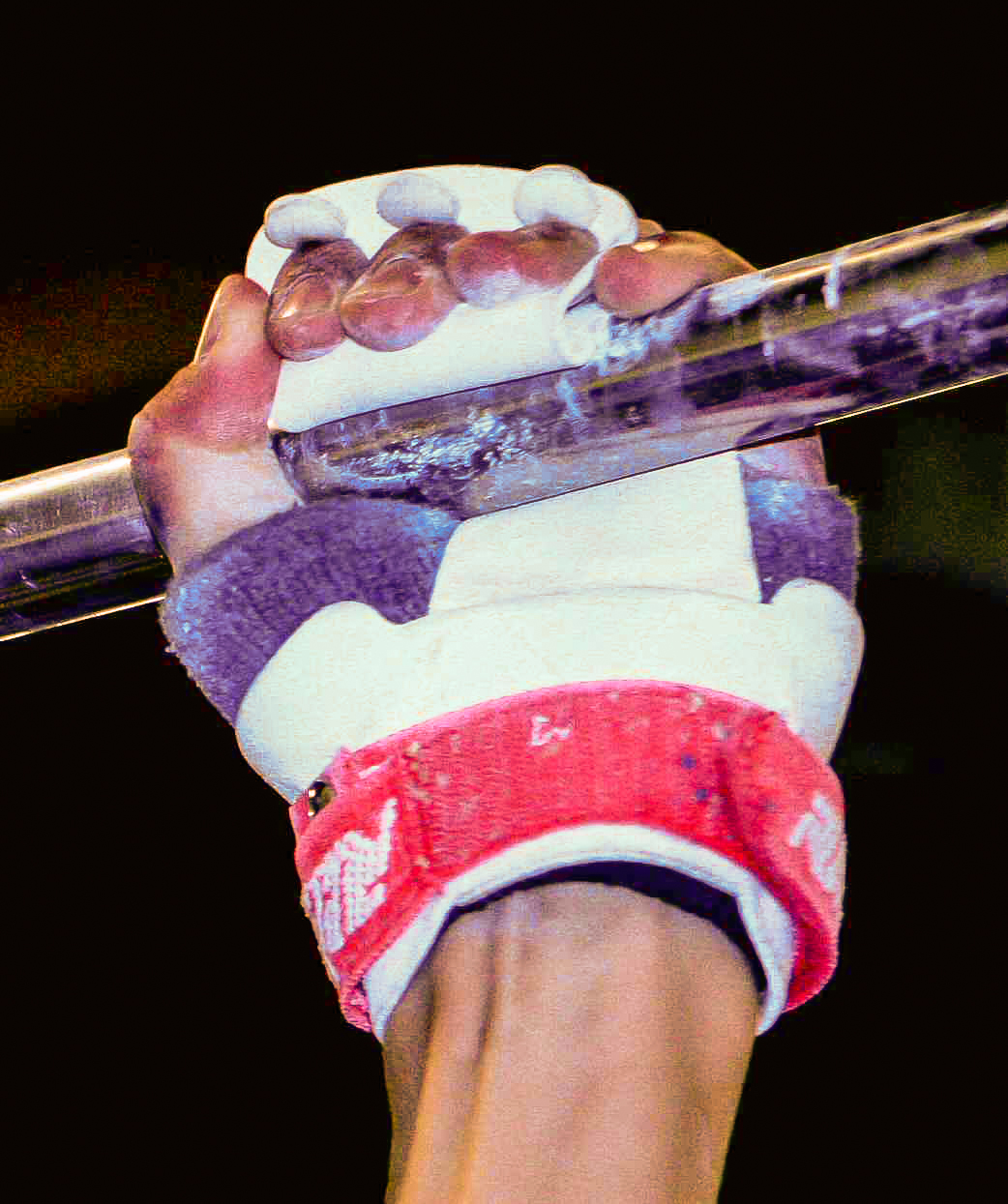
A grip in use on the high bar

Grips are devices that are worn on the hands of artistic gymnasts when performing on various apparatus. They are worn by female gymnasts on the uneven bars, and by male gymnasts on the horizontal bar and still rings. Grips enhance the gymnast's grip on the apparatus and reduce friction, which can cause painful blisters and rips, in which outer layers of skin separate and tear away from the hand.

Grips are optional and not used by all gymnasts. Some athletes substitute sports tape or gauze for grips, while others use bare hands. Most gymnasts apply powdered chalk (typically magnesium carbonate) to their grips or to their hands if they are not using grips so that they do not slip.

== Construction ==
A grip consists of a wide strip of leather, which goes over the hand, joined to a wrist strap that is then locked in place with either velcro or buckles. Some grips, known as dowel grips, incorporate a dowel made of leather, plastic, or rubber. This creates a linear bump on the outer face of the grip. This bump, in conjunction with the bar, forms a detent that leverages the gymnast's grip, thus reducing the hand pressure needed to maintain a hold on the apparatus.

The wrist strap is used to secure the grip on the gymnast's hand and to transfer body weight from the fingers to the wrist. The grip is enhanced when the dowel rests on the apparatus, pulling the leather tight and transferring some of the load to the wrist, reducing the grip required during the most dynamic elements. Gymnasts typically wear soft material, such as cloth wristbands, under the wrist straps to prevent skin chafing. Some brands of grips include soft, removable pads that fit under the wrist straps.

Grips should be regularly checked for continued good fit. Ill-fitting grips or those which have stretched or worn out make it more likely a gymnast will experience a "grip lock" injury, where the dowel locks in place while the gymnast continues to swing on the bar, causing an arm fracture. This injury is more common in male gymnasts than female ones.

== Types of grips ==
Most competitive gymnasts wear dowel grips. On the horizontal bar, men use grips with three finger holes, whereas grips for the still rings have two finger holes. Women's grips generally have two finger holes, but three-hole grips for women are produced as well.

Some gymnasts do not use grips because they prefer to have their hands in direct contact with the bar. For example, Svetlana Khorkina of Russia, the Olympic gold medalist on bars in 1996 and 2000, and the 2013 World uneven bars champion Huang Huidan did not wear grips.

Gymnasts at lower competition levels and those participating in recreational gymnastics typically use grips without dowel rods. Such grips provide no mechanical advantage for gripping the bar; they are mainly used to minimize friction injuries. These grips are usually less expensive and are made of thinner leather.

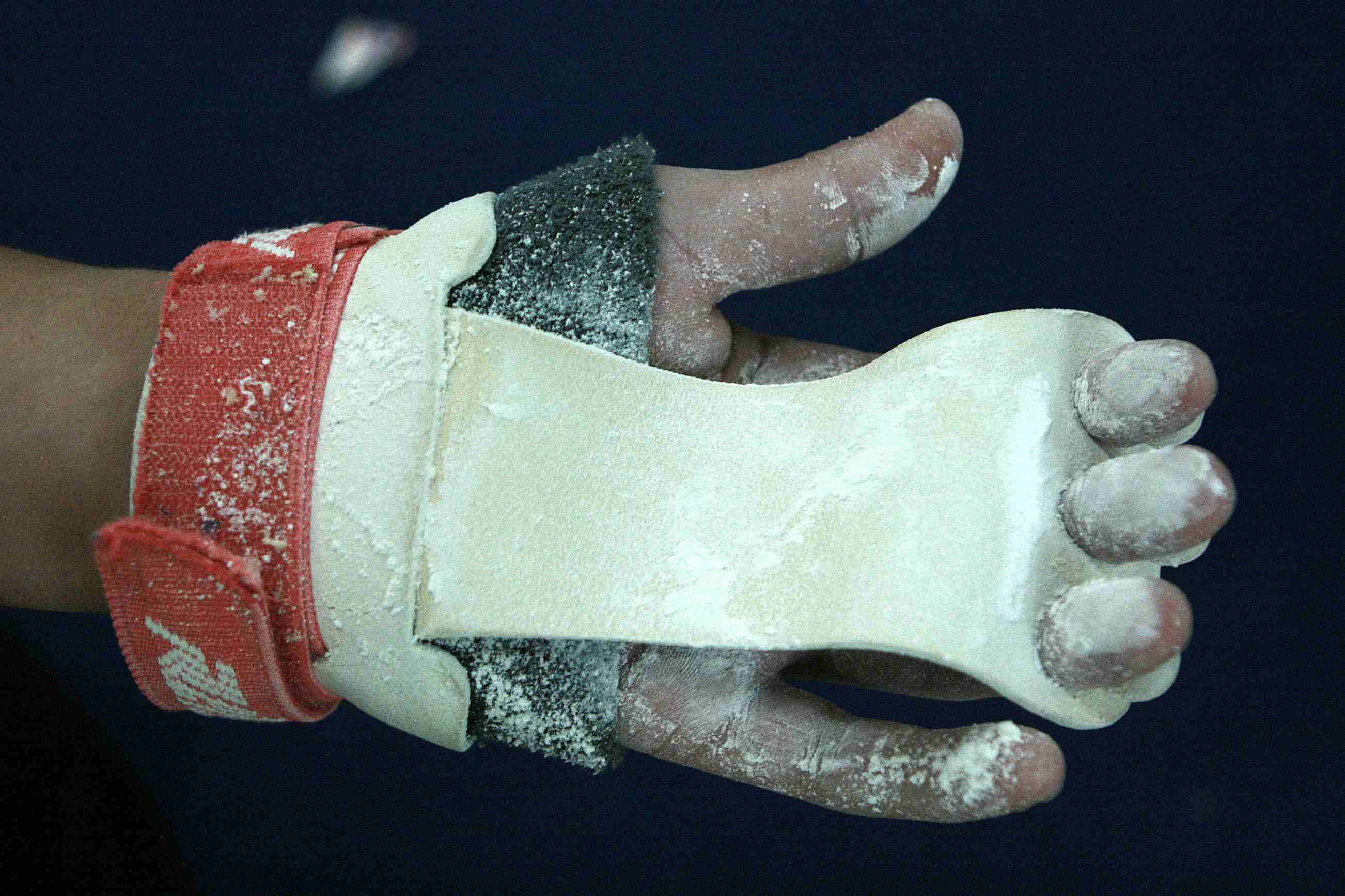
A bar grip (front view).

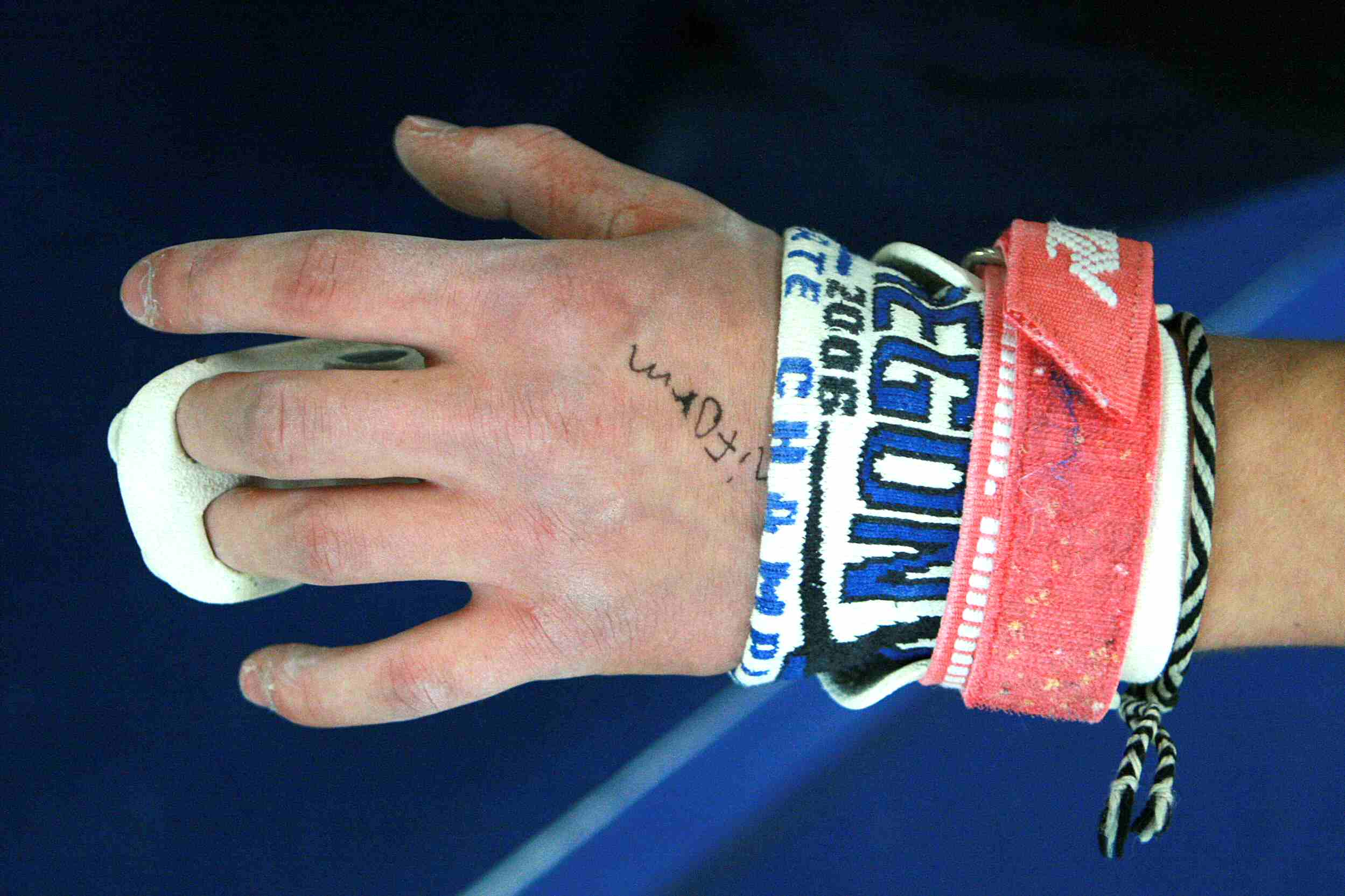
A ring grip (back view).

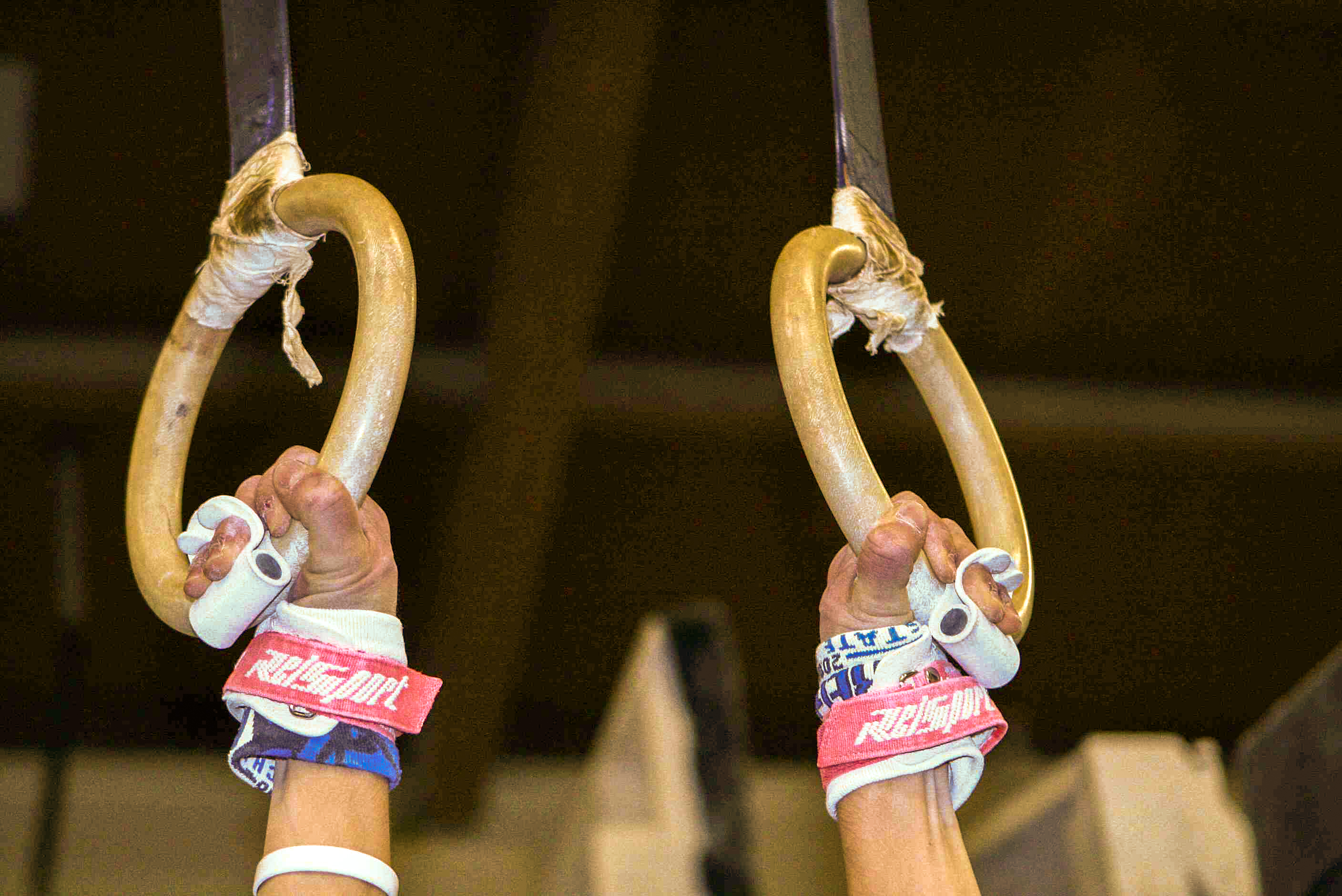
Ring grips in use.
