= Wristband =

Band or strap worn around the wrist

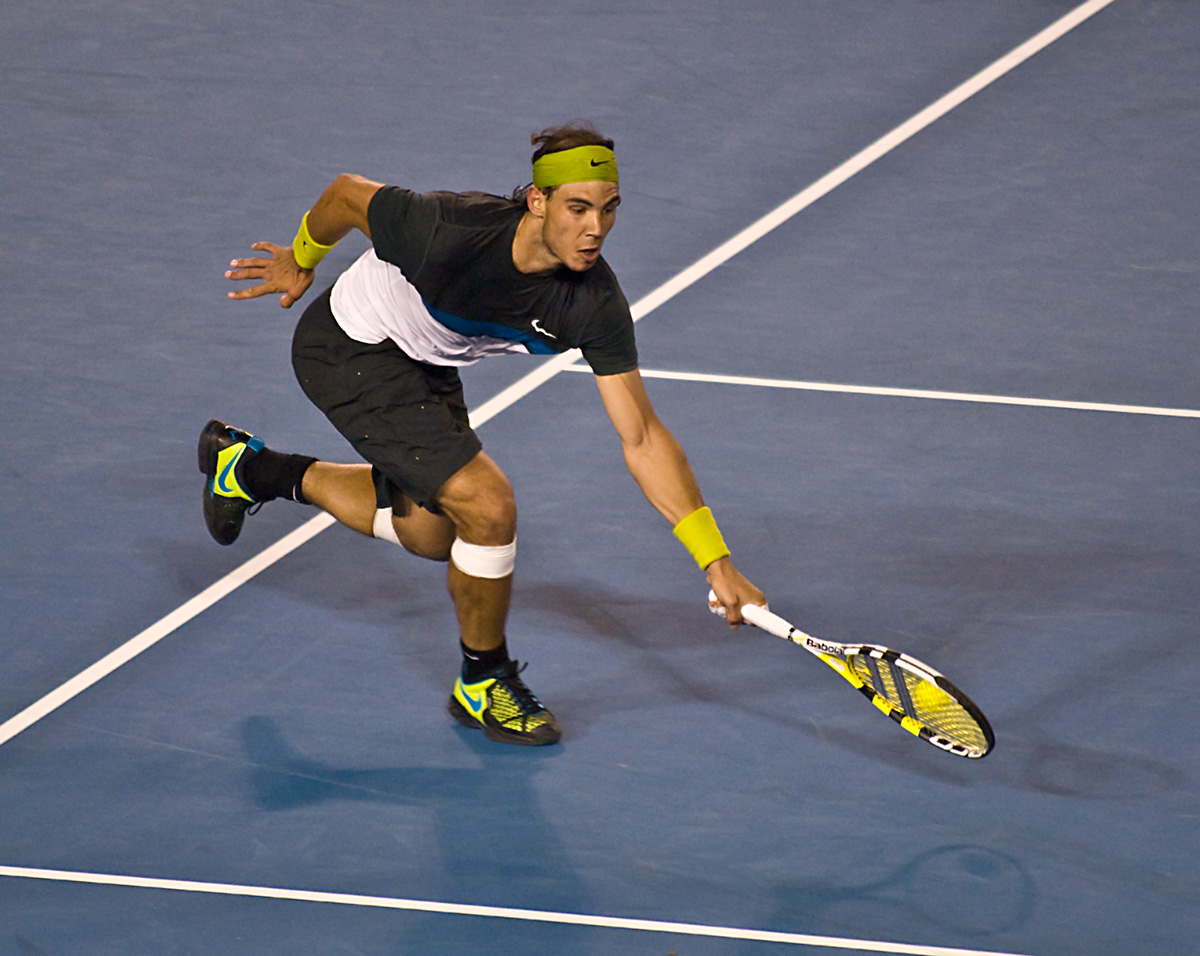
Rafael Nadal wearing yellow wrist bands during a tennis match.

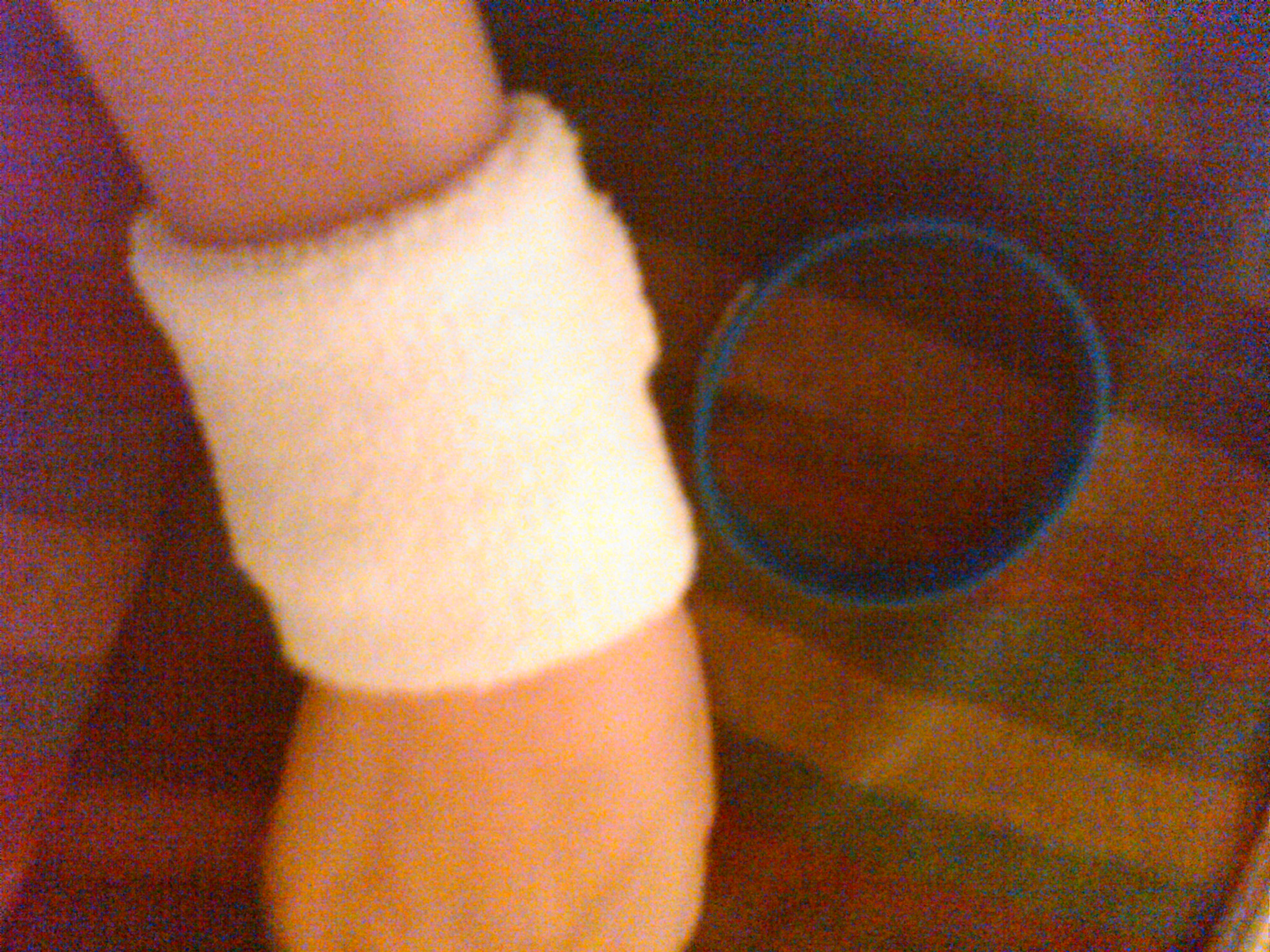
A white terrycloth wristband on an arm, next to a blue silicone wristband.

Wristbands are encircling strips worn on the wrist or lower forearm. The term may refer to a bracelet-like band, similar to that of a wristwatch, to the cuff or other part of a sleeve that covers the wrist, or decorative or functional bands worn on the wrist for many different reasons. Wristbands are often worn and used similarly to event passes such as lanyards to information or allow people entry to events. These wristbands are made from loops of plastic that are placed around the wrist and are used for identification purposes (demonstrating the wearer's authorization to be at a venue, for example).

Another type of wristband is the sweatband; usually made of a towel-like terrycloth material. These are usually used to wipe sweat from the forehead during sport but have been known to be used as a badge or fashion statement. A practice common in mid-1980s punk subculture was to cut the top off of a sock and fashion the elastic into this type of wristband.

== Silicone wristbands ==
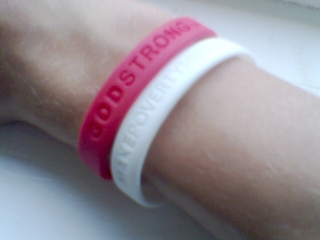
The Make Poverty History white wristband and a red Christian band.

In the early-to-mid-2000s (decade), bracelets often made of silicone became popular. They are worn to demonstrate the wearer's support of a cause or charitable organization, similar to awareness ribbons. Such wristbands are sometimes called awareness bracelets to distinguish them from other types of wristbands. In early 2007 they became an increasingly popular item being sold as merchandise at concerts & sporting events worldwide. The wristbands bearing official logos or trademarks enabled the seller to offer a low price point merchandise option to fans. Silicone wristbands may also be called gel wristbands, jelly wristbands, rubber wristbands and fundraising wristbands. All of these wristbands are made from the same silicone material.

== UV ultra violet wristbands ==
UV Ultra Violet Sensitive silicone wristbands appear clear/white when out of UV light, but when exposed to ultra violet light such as sunlight the wristbands' color changes to blue or fuchsia. These bands can be used as reminders for people to apply sunscreen or stay in the shade on hot summer days.

== Hospital wristbands ==
Example of hospital wristband

Hospital wristbands are a commonly used safety device for identifying patients undergoing medical care (see patient safety and medical identification tag). Available in a variety of sizes to accommodate patients as small as newborns and as large as obese adults, hospital wristbands can be handwritten, embossed, laser-printed or thermal-imaged with names, pictures, medical record numbers, barcodes and other personal identifiers.

Laser printing and thermal imaging—the most advanced technologies for personalizing hospital wristbands—support fonts, colors and barcodes for improved patient safety through electronic patient and medication tracking. Handwritten and embossed wristbands remain in widespread use, however, despite findings on compromised safety reported in 2007. The National Patient Safety Agency (NPSA) found that as many as 2,900 patients each year were receiving the wrong medical care because of the hospital staff's inability to read damaged or otherwise illegible patient information on handwritten and embossed wristbands.

== Event wristbands ==
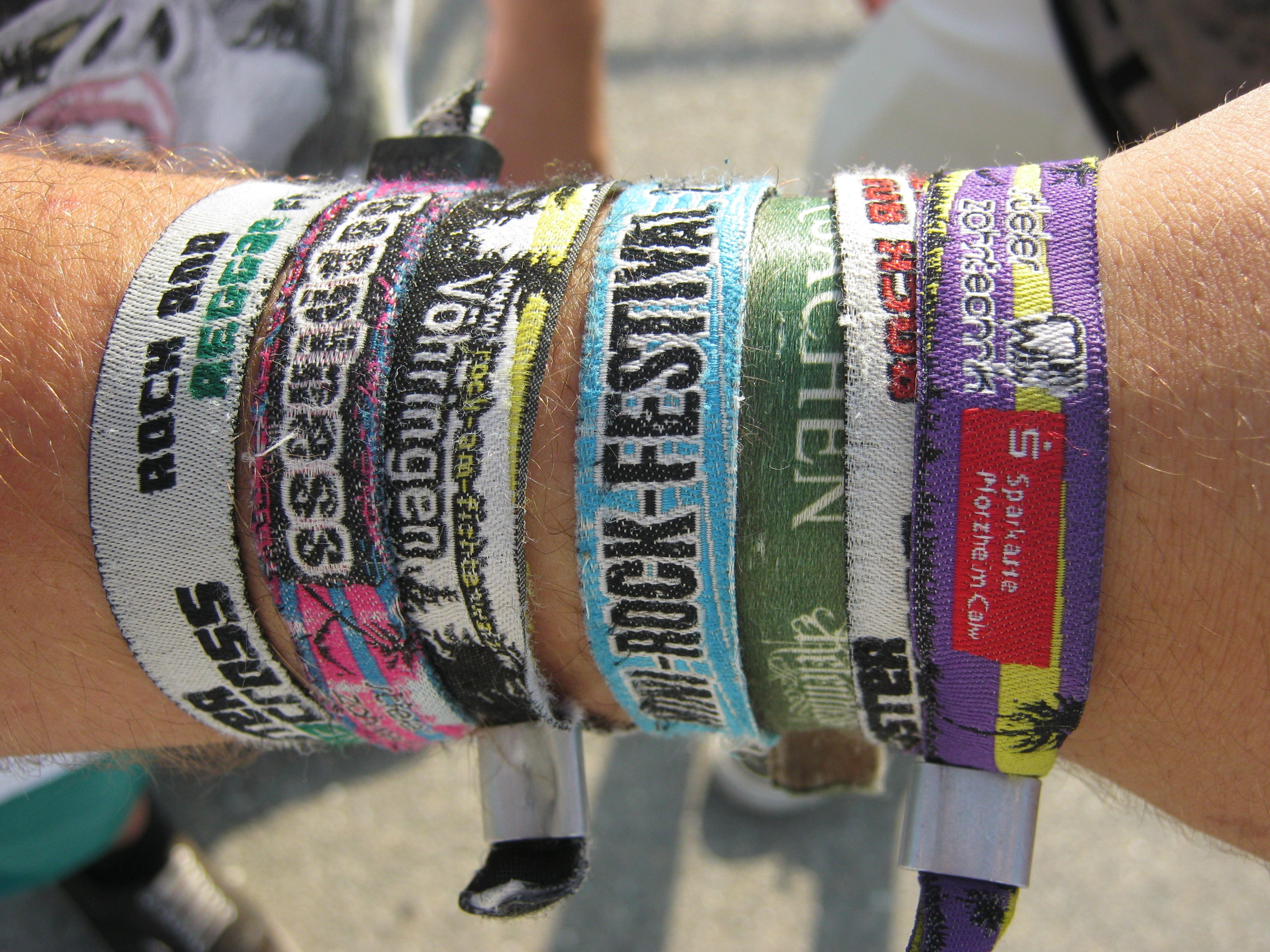
A collection of wristbands from music festivals.

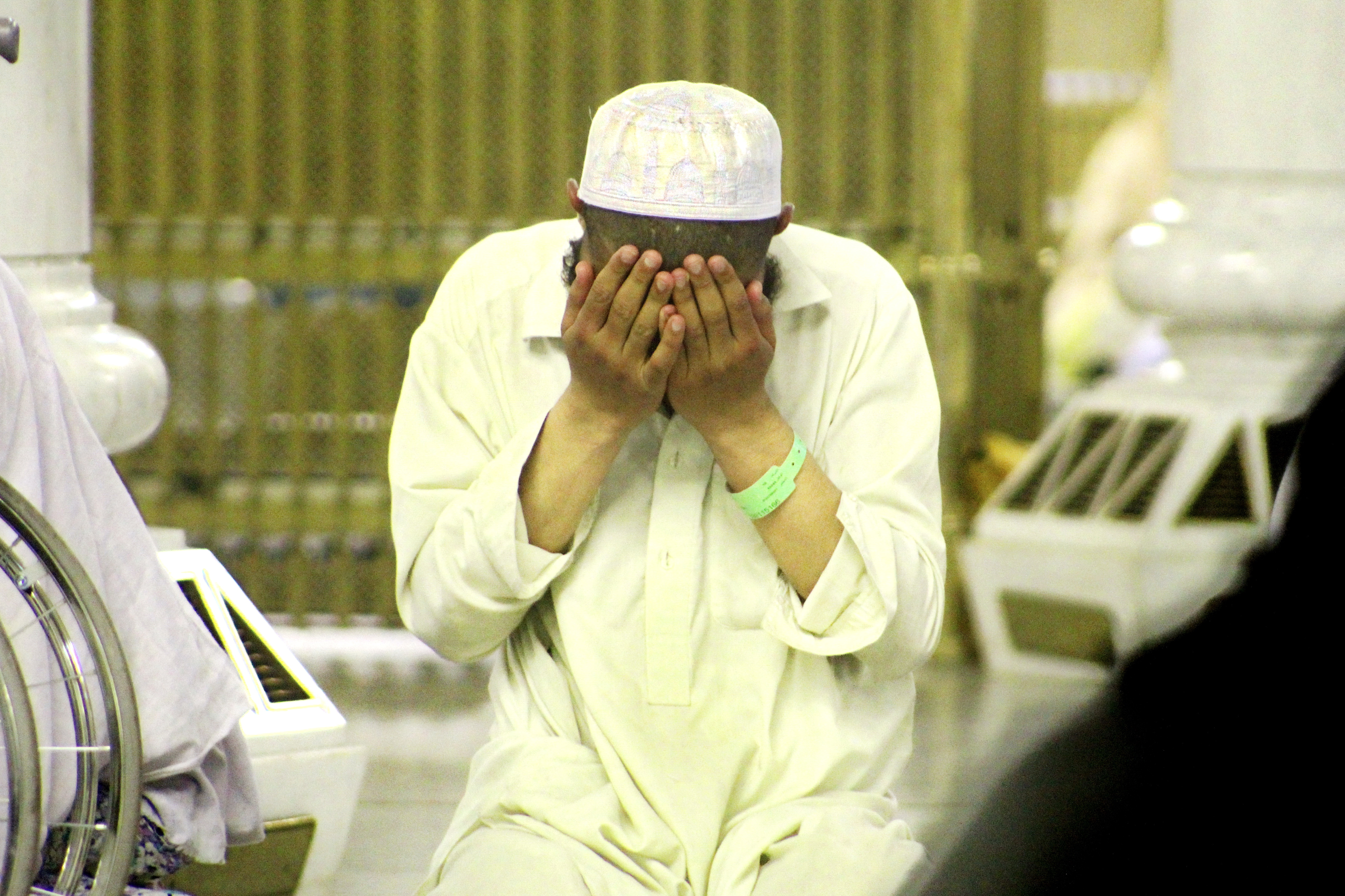
Travel agents and private organizers in Hajj and Umrah provide pilgrims with wearables such as wristbands, as seen on this pilgrim at Masjid al-Haram in Makkah, as identifiers.

Colored wristbands are often given to people attending events such as music festivals and gigs as an access control measure. Counterfeit wristbands are increasingly common.

Silicone wristbands (sometimes referred to as gel bracelets) are popular for fundraising or showing support for a cause. An event organizer might create a custom wristband to give out or sell to those interested in an event or supporting a cause. Some people keep the wristbands as souvenirs or wear the wristbands after the event to show what events they went to.

Further uses for wristbands include event ticketing at music festivals, and sporting events may include an NFC (near field communication) chip that would allow contactless payment at the concessions and turnstiles. Wristbands are ideal to use for dark environments such as nightclubs and bars, or outdoor venues where patrons can be far away, such as festivals and theme parks.

In addition, these styles of colored wristbands are used alongside hospital patient bands to serve as an extra safety reminder and alert for allergies. They will have a standard color and clearly written labeling, such as "Fall Risks" (which may come from medical conditions, injuries and/or medications used), "Allergies" (to cover allergic reactions), or "Latex Allergies" (to make sure medical safety gloves are not made of latex), amongst several other important cautions that would help protect the patient by preventing iatrogenic mistakes.

Different base materials deliver stark differences in durability, print compatibility, wearing comfort, cost and anti-counterfeiting performance. The mainstream wristband wristband materials in the industry fall into 6 core categories: paper composite substrates, synthetic stock, polyweave fabric, thermal printing rolls, PVC & vinyl plastic, and textile fabric.

== See also ==
- Bracelet
- Diving watch#Watch strap/bracelet
- Power Balance
- Smart band
- Smartwatch
- Wrist brace
