= Stener lesion =

Type of thumb injury

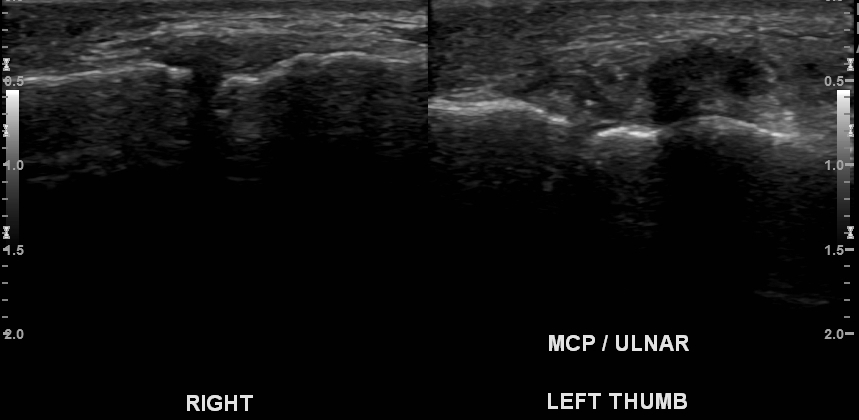
- Stener lesion on left thumb in ultrasound
- Specialty: Emergency medicine

A Stener lesion is a type of traumatic injury to the thumb. It occurs when the aponeurosis of the adductor pollicis muscle becomes interposed between the ruptured ulnar collateral ligament (UCL) of the thumb and its site of insertion at the base of the proximal phalanx. No longer in contact with its insertion site, the UCL cannot spontaneously heal.

== Mechanism ==
In 1962, Bertil Stener described a lesion which he observed to occur in a subset of patients suffering from gamekeeper's thumb. In these patients, the distal attachment of the UCL was traumatically avulsed from its site of insertion at the base of the proximal phalanx of the thumb. The severed end of the ligament would become trapped under the aponeurosis of the adductor pollicis muscle and therefore be unable to return to its proper anatomic position. Consequently, the severed ligament would fold on itself and thus be prevented from healing and restoring stability to the MCP joint.

For a Stener lesion to occur, both the proper and accessory collateral ligaments of the thumb must be completely ruptured. The Stener lesion is present in more than 80% of complete ruptures of the UCL of the thumb.

== Treatment ==
The ulnar collateral ligament is an important stabilizer of the thumb. Thumb instability resulting from disruption of the UCL profoundly impairs the overall function of the involved hand. Because of this, it is critical that these injuries receive appropriate attention and treatment.

Most gamekeeper's thumb injuries are treated by simply immobilizing the joint in a thumb spica splint or a modified wrist splint and allowing the ligament to heal. However, near total or total tears of the UCL may require surgery to achieve a satisfactory repair, especially if accompanied by a Stener lesion.

== History ==
CS Campbell, an orthopedic surgeon, originally coined the term "gamekeeper's thumb" in 1955, after he observed this condition in a number of Scottish gamekeepers. The injury appeared to occur as a result of the particular manner in which they killed small animals such as rabbits. Specifically, the animals were placed on the ground, and their necks were broken as the gamekeeper exerted downward pressure with the thumb and index fingers. This maneuver would place a valgus force upon the abducted metacarpophalangeal (MCP) joint. Over time, this would lead to insufficiency of the ulnar collateral ligament of the thumb, a condition which Campbell referred to as "gamekeeper's thumb".
