= Ulnar collateral ligament injury =

Ulnar collateral ligament injury or UCL injury may refer to:

- Ulnar collateral ligament injury of the elbow
- Ulnar collateral ligament injury of the thumb
