= Dislocated thumb =

The term Dislocated thumb may refer to:

- Ulnar collateral ligament injury of the thumb
- An injury to the Abductor pollicis longus muscle
