= Medial knee injuries =

- Knee diagram (normal)

Medial knee injuries (those to the inside of the knee) are the most common type of knee injury. The medial ligament complex of the knee consists of:

- superficial medial collateral ligament (sMCL), also called the medial collateral ligament (MCL) or tibial collateral ligament
- deep medial collateral ligament (dMCL), or mid-third medial capsular ligament
- posterior oblique ligament (POL), or oblique fibers of the sMCL

This complex is the major stabilizer of the medial knee. Injuries to the medial side of the knee are most commonly isolated to these ligaments. A thorough understanding of the anatomy and function of the medial knee structures, along with a detailed history and physical exam, are imperative to diagnosing and treating these injuries.

== Symptoms ==
Patients often complain of pain and swelling over the medial aspect of the knee joint. They may also report instability with side-to-side movement and during athletic performance that involves cutting or pivoting.

=== Complications ===
Jacobson previously described the common problems to medial knee surgery. It was stressed that adequate diagnosis is imperative and all possible injuries should be evaluated and addressed intraoperatively. Damage to the saphenous nerve and its infrapatellar branch is possible during medial knee surgery, potentially causing numbness or pain over the medial knee and leg. As with all surgeries, there is a risk of bleeding, wound problems, deep vein thrombosis, and infection that can complicate the outcome and rehabilitation process. The long term complication of arthrofibrosis and heterotopic ossification (Pellegrini-Stieda syndrome) are problems that are best addressed with early range of motion and following defined rehabilitation protocols. Failure of graft due to intrinsic mechanical forces should be prevented with preoperative alignment assessment (osteotomy treatment) and proper rehabilitation.

== Causes ==
Medial knee injury is usually caused by a valgus knee force, a tibial external rotation force, or a combination thereof. This mechanism is often seen in sports that involve aggressive knee flexion like ice hockey, skiing, and football.

== Anatomy and function ==
Knee diagram

Structures on the medial side of the knee include the tibia, femur, vastus medialis obliquus muscle, semitendinosus tendon, gracilis tendon, sartorius tendon, adductor magnus tendon, medial head of the gastrocnemius muscle, semimembranosus tendon, medial meniscus, medial patellofemoral ligament (MPFL), sMCL, dMCL, and POL. It has been found that the most important structures for stabilization in this area of the knee are ligaments: sMCL, dMCL, and POL.

=== Bones ===
The bones of the knee are the femur, patella, tibia, and fibula. The fibula is on the lateral side of the knee and the patella has little effect on the medial side of the knee. The bony congruity of the medial knee consists of the opposing surfaces of the medial femoral condyle and the medial tibial plateau. On the medial femoral condyle there are three bony landmarks that are important: the medial epicondyle, adductor tubercle, and gastrocnemius tubercle. The medial epicondyle is the most distal and anterior prominence. The adductor tubercle is just proximal and posterior to the medial epicondyle. The gastrocnemius tubercle is just distal and posterior to the adductor tubercle.

=== Ligaments and biomechanical function ===
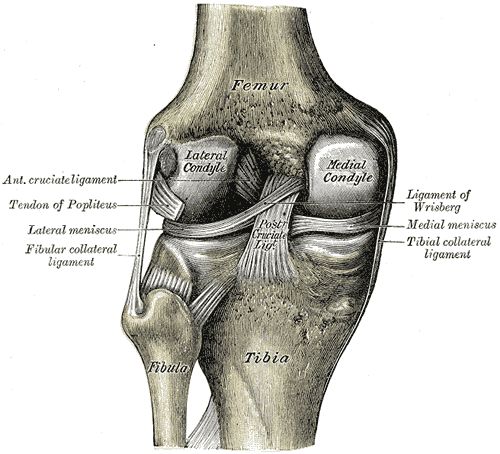
Left knee joint from behind, showing interior ligaments.

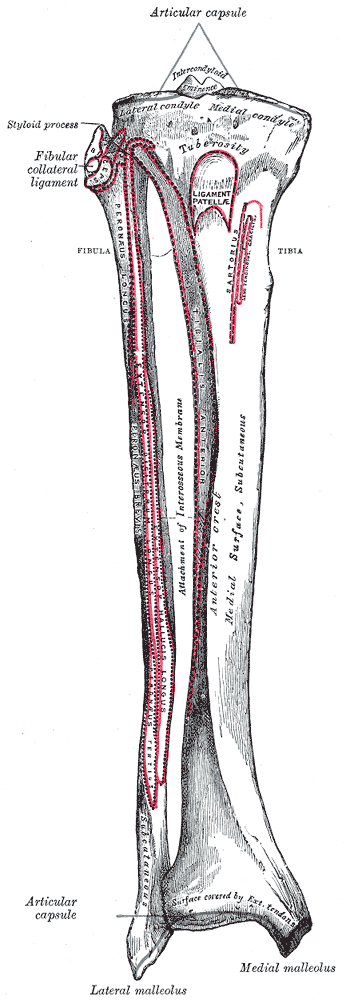
Tibia muscle attachments (seen from front)

The sMCL connects the femur to the tibia. It originates just proximal and posterior to the medial epicondyle (not directly on the epicondyle) and splits into two distinct sections. One tibial section attaches to soft tissue, 1 cm distal to the joint line. The other tibial section attaches directly to the tibia, anterior to the posteromedial tibial crest, 6 cm distal to the joint line. This distal attachment is the stronger of the two and makes up the floor of the pes anserine bursa. The proximal tibial attachment of the sMCL is the primary stabilizer to valgus force on the knee, whereas the distal tibial attachment is the primary stabilizer of external rotation at 30° of knee flexion.

The dMCL is a thickening of the medial aspect of the capsule surrounding the knee. It originates on the femur 1 cm distal to the sMCL origin and inserts 3–4 mm distal to the joint line. It runs parallel to and underneath the sMCL. The dMCL connects directly to the medial meniscus and therefore can be divided into meniscofemoral and meniscotibial ligament components.

The meniscofemoral ligament is longer than the meniscotibial ligament, which is shorter and thicker in nature. The meniscofemoral ligament is a primary internal rotation stabilizer and a secondary external rotation stabilizer, activated when the sMCL fails. The meniscotibial ligament acts to secondarily stabilize internal rotation.

The POL (called by older texts: oblique portion of the sMCL) is a fascial expansion with three main components: superficial, central (tibial), and capsular. The central arm is the strongest and thickest. It arises from the semimembranosus tendon and connects anterior and distal to the gastrocnemius tubercle via the posterior joint capsule. The POL, therefore, is not a stand-alone structure, but a thickening of the posteromedial joint capsule. It stabilizes internal rotation of the knee through all degrees of flexion but bears the most load when internally rotated in full extension. It also acts as a secondary external rotation stabilizer.

The MPFL arises from the fibers of the vastus medialis obliquus muscle and attaches distally to the superior medial aspect of the patella. This ligament acts to keep the patella within the trochlear groove during flexion and extension. It is rarely injured from a medial knee injury unless there is a concurrent lateral patellar subluxation or dislocation.

=== Tendons and muscles ===
The adductor magnus tendon attaches to the distal medial femoral condyle just posterior and proximal to the adductor tubercle. It has a fascial expansion on the distal-medial aspect that attaches to the medial gastrocnemius tendon, capsular arm of the POL, and posteromedial joint capsule. The thick distal lateral aspect attaches to the medial supracondylar ridge. The adductor magnus tendon is an excellent, consistent landmark because it is rarely injured. The vastus medialis obliquus muscle courses over the anteromedial thigh, attaching along the adductor magnus anterior border and to the quadratus femoris tendon. The medial gastrocnemius tendon arises proximal and posterior to the gastrocnemius tubercle of the medial femoral condyle. This is another important landmark because it is rarely injured and attaches close to the capsular arm of the POL, thus helping the surgeon locate the femoral attachment of the POL.

== Diagnosis ==
The majority of medial knee injuries are isolated ligamentous injuries. Most patients will relate a history of a traumatic blow to the lateral aspect of the knee (causing a valgus force) or a non-contact valgus force. Acute injuries are much easier to diagnose clinically, while chronic injuries may be less apparent due to difficulty in differentiating from a lateral knee injury, possibly requiring valgus stress radiographs.

=== Physical exam ===
The physical exam should always begin with a visual inspection of the joint for any outward signs of trauma. Palpation should follow paying close attention to effusion and subjective tenderness during the exam. The practitioner should also evaluate the contralateral (non-injured) knee to note any differences in gross appearance and landmarks. Palpation should focus specifically on the meniscofemoral and meniscotibial aspects of the sMCL. It has been reported that injury to one versus other has implications for healing, so localization of the site of injury is beneficial. Testing of the knee joint should be done using the following techniques and the findings compared to the contralateral, normal knee:

- Valgus stress at 0° and 20°- This test puts direct stress on the medial knee structures, reproducing the mechanism of injury. Valgus stress testing is done with the patient supine on the exam table. The lower extremity, supported by the examiner, is abducted. The examiner's fingers monitor the medial joint space for gapping while placing the opposite hand on the ankle. The knee is placed in 20° of flexion. The examiner then uses their own thigh as a fulcrum at the knee and applies a valgus force (pulling the foot and ankle away from the patient's body). The force is then used to establish the amount of gapping present within the joint. It has been reported that 20° of flexion is best for isolating the sMCL, allowing the practitioner to establish the degree of injury (see Classification). Additional testing is done at 0° to determine if a Grade III injury is present.
- Anteromedial drawer test- This test is performed with the patient supine with the knee flexed to 80-90°. The foot is externally rotated 10-15° and the examiner supplies an anterior and external rotational force. The joint can then be evaluated for tibial anteromedial rotation, taking care to recognize the possibility of posterolateral corner instability giving similar rotational test results. As always, compare the test in the opposite knee.
- Dial Test (anteromedial rotation test)- This test should be executed with the patient lying both supine and prone. When the patient is supine, the knees must be flexed 30° off the table. The thigh is then stabilized and the foot externally rotated. The examiner watches for the tibial tubercle of the affected knee to rotate as the foot rotates, comparing it to the contralateral knee. A positive test will show rotation of greater than 10-15° of rotation compared to the opposite knee. This is most easily assessed with a hand placed over the tibia while testing. When the patient is prone, the knee is flexed to 90° and both feet are externally rotated and compared, noting the difference from the non-injured joint. Similar to the anteromedial drawer test, a false positive test can result from a posterolateral corner injury. Testing at both 30° and 90° helps to distinguish between these injuries: one should monitor where the tibial rotation occurs (anteromedial or posterolateral) in the supine position and also assess for medial or lateral joint line gapping to differentiate between these two injuries.

=== Classification ===
Grading of medial knee injuries is dependent on the amount of medial joint space gapping found upon valgus stress testing with the knee in 20° of flexion. Grade I injuries have no instability clinically and are associated with tenderness only, representing a mild sprain. Grade II injuries have broad tenderness over the medial knee and have some gapping with a firm end-point during valgus testing; this represents a partial tear of the ligaments. Grade III injuries have a complete ligamentous tear. There will be no end-point to valgus stress testing. The historic quantified definition of grades I, II, and III represented 0–5 mm, 5–10 mm, and >10 mm of medial compartment gapping, respectively. LaPrade et al. reported, however, that a simulated grade III sMCL injury showed only 3.2 mm of increased medial compartment gapping compared to the intact state. Additionally, with the knee in full extension, if valgus stress testing reveals more than 1–2 mm of medial compartment gapping present, a concomitant anterior cruciate ligament (ACL) or posterior cruciate ligament (PCL) injury is suspected.

=== Radiographs ===
Anterior-posterior (AP) radiographs are useful for reliably assessing normal anatomical landmarks. Bilateral valgus stress AP images can show a difference in medial joint space gapping. It has been reported that an isolated grade III sMCL tear will show an increase in medial compartment gapping of 1.7 mm at 0° of knee flexion and 3.2 mm at 20° of knee flexion, compared to the contralateral knee. Additionally, a complete medial ligamentous disruption (sMCL, dMCL, and POL) will show increased gapping by 6.5 mm at 0° and 9.8 mm at 20° during valgus stress testing. Pellegrini-Stieda syndrome can also be seen on AP radiographs. This finding is due to calcification of the sMCL (heterotopic ossification) caused by the chronic tear of the ligament.

=== MRI ===
Magnetic resonance imaging (MRI) can be helpful in assessing for a ligamentous injury to the medial side of the knee. Milewski et al. has found that grade I to III classification can be seen on MRI. With a high-quality image (1.5 tesla or 3 tesla magnet) and no previous knowledge of the patient's history, musculoskeletal radiologists were able to accurately diagnose medial knee injury 87% of the time. MRI can also show associated bone bruises on the lateral side of the knee, which one study shows, happen in almost half of medial knee injuries.

Knee MRIs should be avoided for knee pain without mechanical symptoms or effusion, and upon non-successful results from a functional rehabilitation program.

== Treatment ==
Treatment of medial knee injuries varies depending on location and classification of the injuries. The consensus of many studies is that isolated grade I, II, and III injuries are usually well suited to non-operative treatment protocols. Acute grade III injuries with concomitant multiligament injuries or knee dislocation involving medial side injury should undergo surgical treatment. Chronic grade III injuries should also undergo surgical treatment if the patient is experiencing rotational instability or side-to-side instability.

=== Nonoperative treatment ===
Conservative treatment of isolated medial knee injuries (grades I-III) begins with controlling swelling and protecting the knee. Swelling is managed well with rest, ice, elevation, and compression wraps. Protection can be performed using a hinged brace that stabilizes against varus and valgus stress but allows full flexion and extension. The brace should be worn for the first four to six weeks of rehabilitation, especially during physical exercise to prevent trauma to the healing ligament. Stationary bike exercises are the recommended exercise for active range of motion and should be increased as tolerated by the patient. Side-to-side movements of the knee should be avoided. The patient is allowed to bear weight as tolerated and should perform quadriceps strengthening exercises along with range of motion exercises. The typical return-to-play time frame for most athletes with a grade III medial knee injury undergoing a rehabilitation program is 5 to 7 weeks.

=== Operative treatment ===
It has been reported that severe acute and chronic grade III medial knee injuries often involve the sMCL in combination with the POL. Direct surgical repair or reconstruction, therefore, should be performed for both of these ligaments because they both play an important role in static medial knee stability. The biomechanically validated approach is to reconstruct both the POL and both divisions of the sMCL.

==== Severe acute tears ====
Surgery involving direct repair (with or without augmentation from a hamstring autograft), among other previously used techniques, have not been biomechanically tested. An anatomical reconstruction of the sMCL and POL has been biomechanically validated.

==== Chronic instability ====
Underlying causes of chronic medial knee instability must be identified before surgical reconstruction is performed. More specifically, patients with genu valgum (knock-kneed) alignment must be evaluated and treated with an osteotomy(s) to establish balanced forces on knee ligaments, preventing premature failure of concurrent cruciate ligament reconstruction. These patients should be rehabilitated after the osteotomy heals before it can be verified that they do not still have functional limitations. Once proper alignment is achieved, reconstruction can be performed.

==== Anatomic medial knee reconstruction ====
This technique, described in detail by LaPrade et al., uses two grafts in four separate tunnels. An incision is made over the medial knee 4 cm medial to the patella, and extended distally 7 to 8 cm past the joint line, directly over the pes anserinus tendons.

Within the distal borders of the incision, the semitendinosus and gracilis tendons are found beneath the sartorius muscle fascia. The distal tibial attachment of the sMCL can be found under these identified tendons, making up the floor of the pes anserine bursa, 6 cm distal to the joint line. Once identified, the remaining soft tissue is removed from the attachment site. An eyelet pin is then drilled through attachment site transversely through the tibia, making sure the starting point is located at the posterior aspect of the site to ensure better biomechanical outcomes. Over the eyelet pin, a 7-mm reamer (6 mm considered in smaller patients) is reamed to a depth of 25 mm. Once prepared, attention is directed to preparing the reconstruction tunnel for the tibial attachment of the POL. Above the anterior arm attachment of the semimembranosus muscle tendon, the tibial attachment of the central arm of the POL is identified. This attachment is exposed by making a small incision parallel to the fibers along the posterior edge of the anterior arm of the semimembranosus tendon. Once exposed, an eyelet pin is drilled through the tibia toward Gerdy's tubercle (anterolateral tibia). After verifying the correct anatomic eyelet pin placement, a 7-mm reamer is used over the pin to drill a tunnel depth of 25 mm.

Moving to the femoral attachments of the ligaments, the first step is identifying the adductor magnus muscle tendon, and its corresponding attachment site, near the adductor tubercle. Just distal and slightly anterior to this tubercle is the bony prominence of the medial epicondyle. The attachment site of the sMCL can be identified slightly proximal and posterior to the epicondyle. An eyelet pin can now be passed transversely through the femur at this site. The tunnel at this location, however, should be drilled after identifying the POL attachment site.

The next step of identifying the POL femoral attachment is done by locating the gastrocnemius tubercle (2.6 mm distal and 3.1 mm anterior to the medial gastrocnemius tendon attachment on the femur). If the posteromedial capsule is not intact, the POL attachment site is located 7.7 mm distal and 2.9 mm anterior to the gastrocnemius tubercle. With the capsule intact, however, an incision is made along the posterior aspect of the sMCL, parallel to its fibers. The central arm of the POL can then be found at its femoral attachment site. Once identified, an eyelet pin is passed transversely through the femur. The distances between the femoral attachment site of the POL and the sMCL (on average, 11mm) should now be measured to verify that the anatomic attachment sites have been correctly identified. Once this is done, the femoral tunnels for the sMCL and POL can be reamed to a depth of 25 mm using a 7-mm reamer.

The next aspect of the surgery is preparation and placement of the reconstruction grafts. The preparation can be done while the other steps are being completed by another surgeon or physician's assistant. The semitendinosus tendon can be harvested using a hamstring stripper for use as the reconstruction autograft. The autograft is sectioned into a 16-cm length for the sMCL reconstruction and 12-cm length for the POL reconstruction. These lengths are also used if the surgery is done with cadaver allograft. The sMCL and POL grafts are pulled into their respective femoral tunnels and each secured with a cannulated bioabsorbable screw. The grafts are passed distally along their native courses to the tibial attachments. The sMCL is passed under sartorius fascia (and any remaining sMCL fibers). Both grafts are passed (but not yet secured) into their respective tibial tunnels using the existing eyelet pins. If simultaneous cruciate ligament surgery is underway, the cruciate reconstructions are secured before securing the medial ligaments.

Securing the POL graft is done in full knee extension. The graft is pulled tight and fixed using a bioabsorbable screw. The knee is then flexed to 20°. Making sure the tibia remains in neutral rotation, a varus force is used to ensure there is no medial compartment gapping of the knee. The sMCL graft is then tightened and fixed with a bioabsorbable screw.

The final step of reconstruction ligament fixation is the proximal tibial attachment of the sMCL. This soft-tissue attachment can be reproduced with a suture anchor placed 12.2 mm distal to the medial joint line (average location), directly medial to the anterior arm of the semimembranosus tibial attachment. Once this aspect of the sMCL is secured to the suture anchor, the knee is put through range of motion testing by the physician to determine the "safe zone" of knee motion which is used during the first post-operative day rehabilitation (below).

== Rehabilitation ==
- Nonoperative Rehabilitation As mentioned in the Nonoperative Treatment section, the principles of rehabilitation are to control swelling, protect the knee (bracing), reactivate the quadriceps muscle, and restore range of motion. Early weight bearing is encouraged as tolerated, using crutches as little as possible, with a goal of walking without a limp. Stationary biking is the preferred range of motion exercise, stimulating the ligament to heal faster. Time on the bike and resistance should be increased as tolerated by the patient. Side-to-side movement should be restricted until after 3 to 4 weeks to allow the adequate healing. Proprioceptive and balance activities can progress after clinical exam or valgus stress radiographs reveal healing. Athletes can often resume full activities within 5 to 7 weeks after an isolated sMCL injury.
- Postoperative Rehabilitation Postoperative rehabilitation protocols for reconstructed or repaired medial knee injuries focus on protecting the ligaments/grafts, managing swelling, reactivating the quadriceps, and establishing range of motion. A safe range of motion ("safe zone") should be measured by the surgeon intraoperatively and relayed to the rehabilitation specialist to prevent overstressing the ligaments during rehabilitation. The ideal passive range of motion is 0 to 90° of flexion on postoperative day one after surgery and should be followed for 2 weeks, as tolerated, with a goal of 130° of flexion at the end of the 6th week. To protect the newly reconstructed ligaments, a hinged knee brace should be used. Swelling should be managed with cryotherapy and compression. Patellofemoral mobilization, quadriceps reactivation, and frequent ankle pumps are also utilized right after surgery to prevent arthrofibrosis. Non-weight bearing to touch-down weight bearing is recommended for the first 6 weeks, progressing to closed-kinetic-chain exercises thereafter. Light-resistance stationary biking is also started at 2 weeks and can be increased as tolerated. Gait mechanics are addressed when the patient is able to bear their full weight. The patient should be able to walk without limping or developing swelling in the joint. Rehabilitation can only move as fast as tolerated and effusion must be monitored and managed at all times to ensure good results. Once motion, strength, and balance are regained, plyometric and agility exercises are started at 16 weeks. Brisk walking for 1 to 2 miles should be well tolerated before the patient starts a jogging program. Return to sports may be assessed at this point, providing no functional or stability deficits are present. Rehabilitation should be supervised by a professional specialist working along with the surgeon. Protocols may be adjusted in the presence of concomitant ligament reconstructions or osteotomies. Valgus stress AP radiographs (mentioned above) are an excellent and cost-effective way to monitor postoperative results and follow-up.

== Future research ==
Future research with regard to medial knee injuries should evaluate clinical outcomes between different reconstruction techniques. Determining the advantages and disadvantages of these techniques would also be beneficial for optimizing treatment.
