= Scaphoid fracture =

Fracture of the scaphoid bone in the wrist

- Other names: Carpal scaphoid fracture, carpal navicular fracture
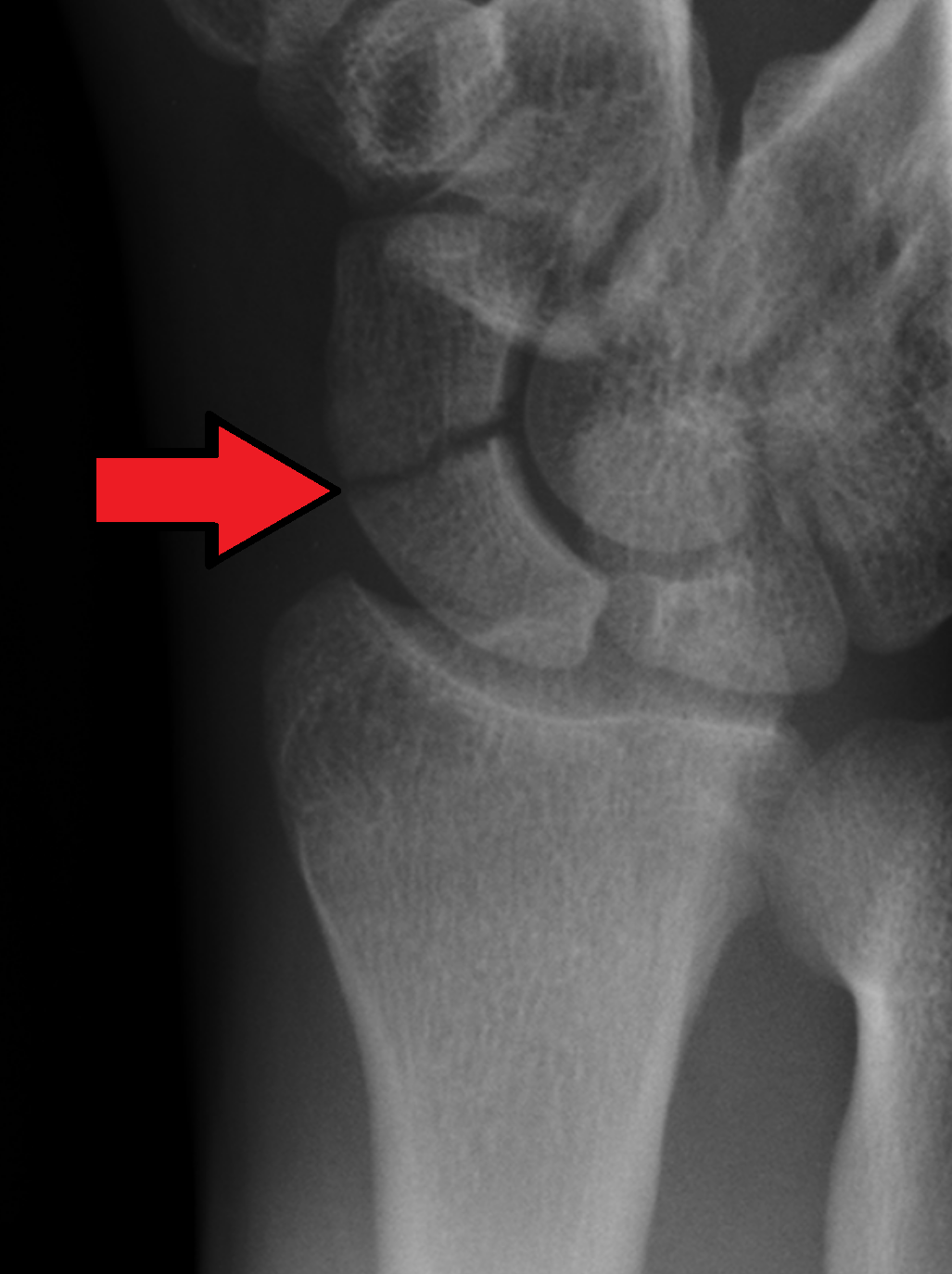
- An X-ray showing a fracture through the waist of the scaphoid
- Specialty: Hand surgery, emergency medicine
- Symptoms: Pain at the base of the thumb, swelling
- Complications: Nonunion, avascular necrosis, arthritis
- Types: Proximal, medial, distal
- Causes: Fall on an outstretched hand
- Diagnostic method: Examination, X-rays, MRI, bone scan
- Differential diagnosis: Distal radius fracture, De Quervain's tenosynovitis, scapholunate dissociation, wrist sprain
- Prevention: Wrist guards
- Treatment: Not displaced: Cast; Displaced: Surgery
- Prognosis: Healing may take up to six months

A scaphoid fracture is a break of the scaphoid bone in the wrist. Symptoms generally includes pain at the base of the thumb which is worse with use of the hand. The anatomic snuffbox is generally tender and swelling may occur. Complications may include nonunion of the fracture, avascular necrosis of the proximal part of the bone, and arthritis.

Scaphoid fractures are most commonly caused by a fall on an outstretched hand. Diagnosis is generally based on a combination of clinical examination and medical imaging. Some fractures may not be visible on plain X-rays. In such cases the affected area may be immobilised in a splint or cast and reviewed with repeat X-rays in two weeks, or alternatively an MRI or bone scan may be performed.

The fracture may be preventable by using wrist guards during certain activities. In those in whom the fracture remains well aligned a cast is generally sufficient. If the fracture is displaced then surgery is generally recommended. Healing may take up to six months.

It is the most commonly fractured carpal bone. Males are affected more often than females.

== Signs and symptoms ==
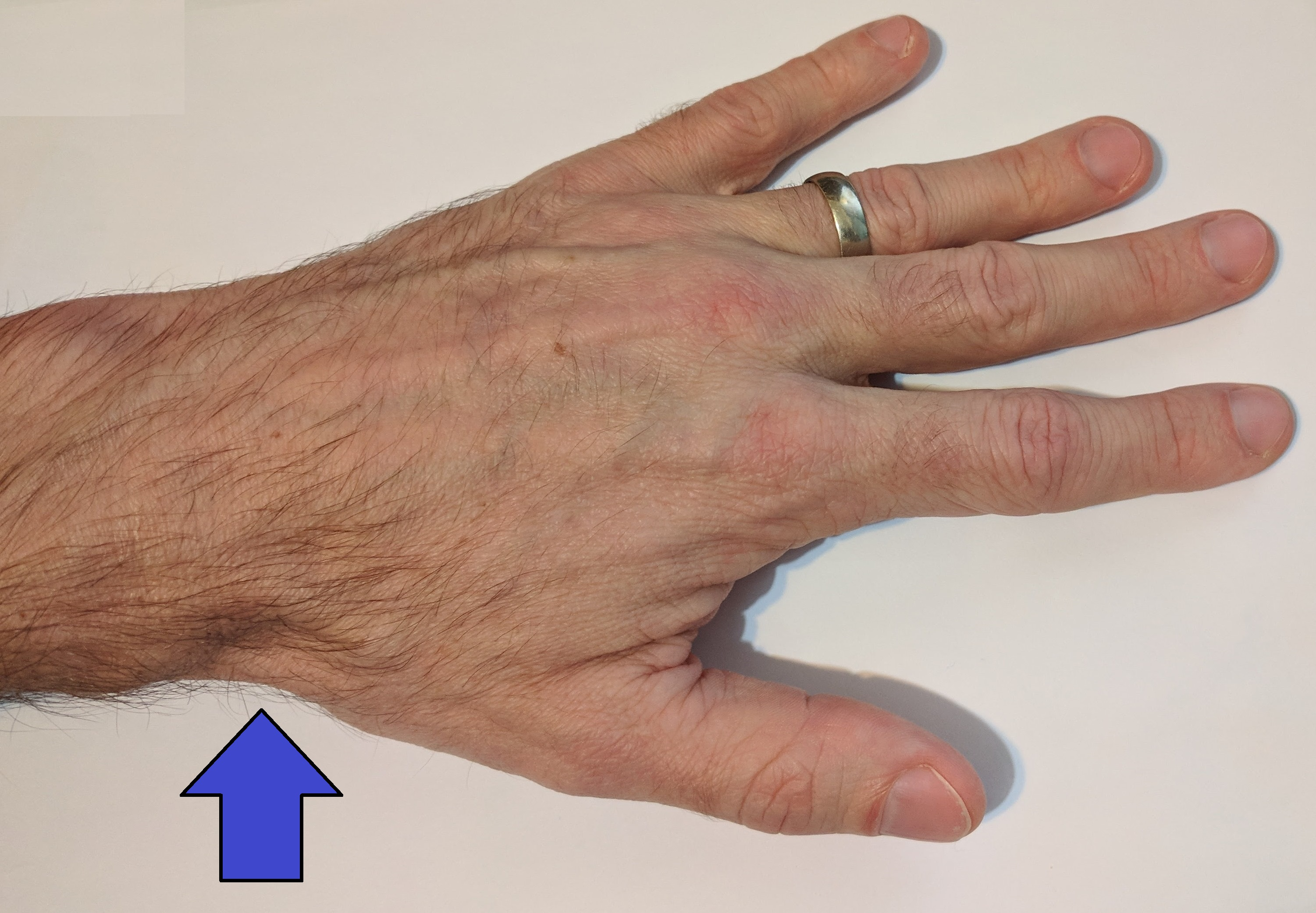
Anatomical snuff box

People with scaphoid fractures generally have snuffbox tenderness.

Focal tenderness is usually present in one of three places: 1) volar prominence at the distal wrist for distal pole fractures; 2) anatomic snuff box for waist or midbody fractures; 3) distal to Lister's tubercle for proximal pole fractures.

=== Complications ===
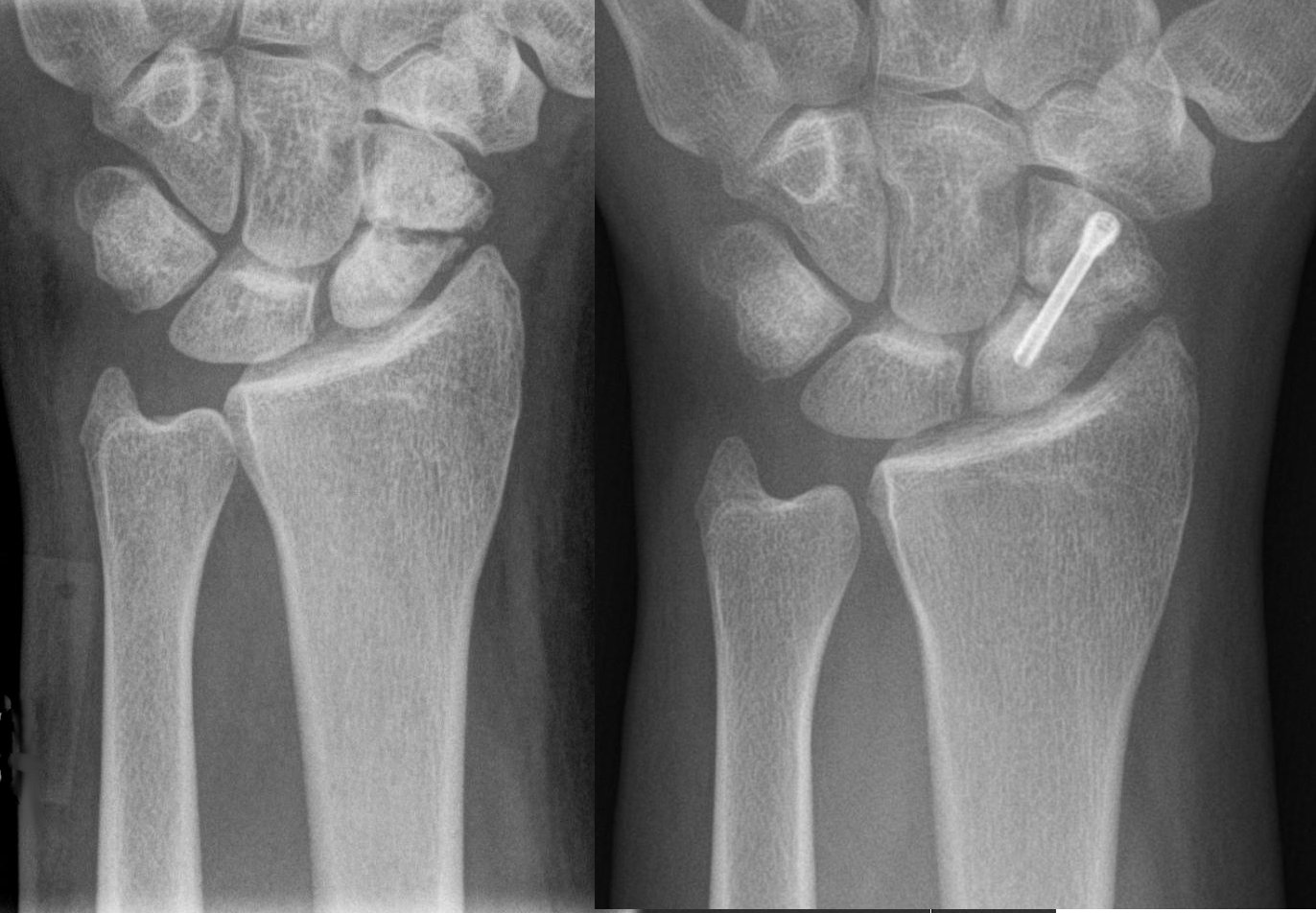
Scaphoid pseudarthrosis, before and after treatment with Herbert screw.

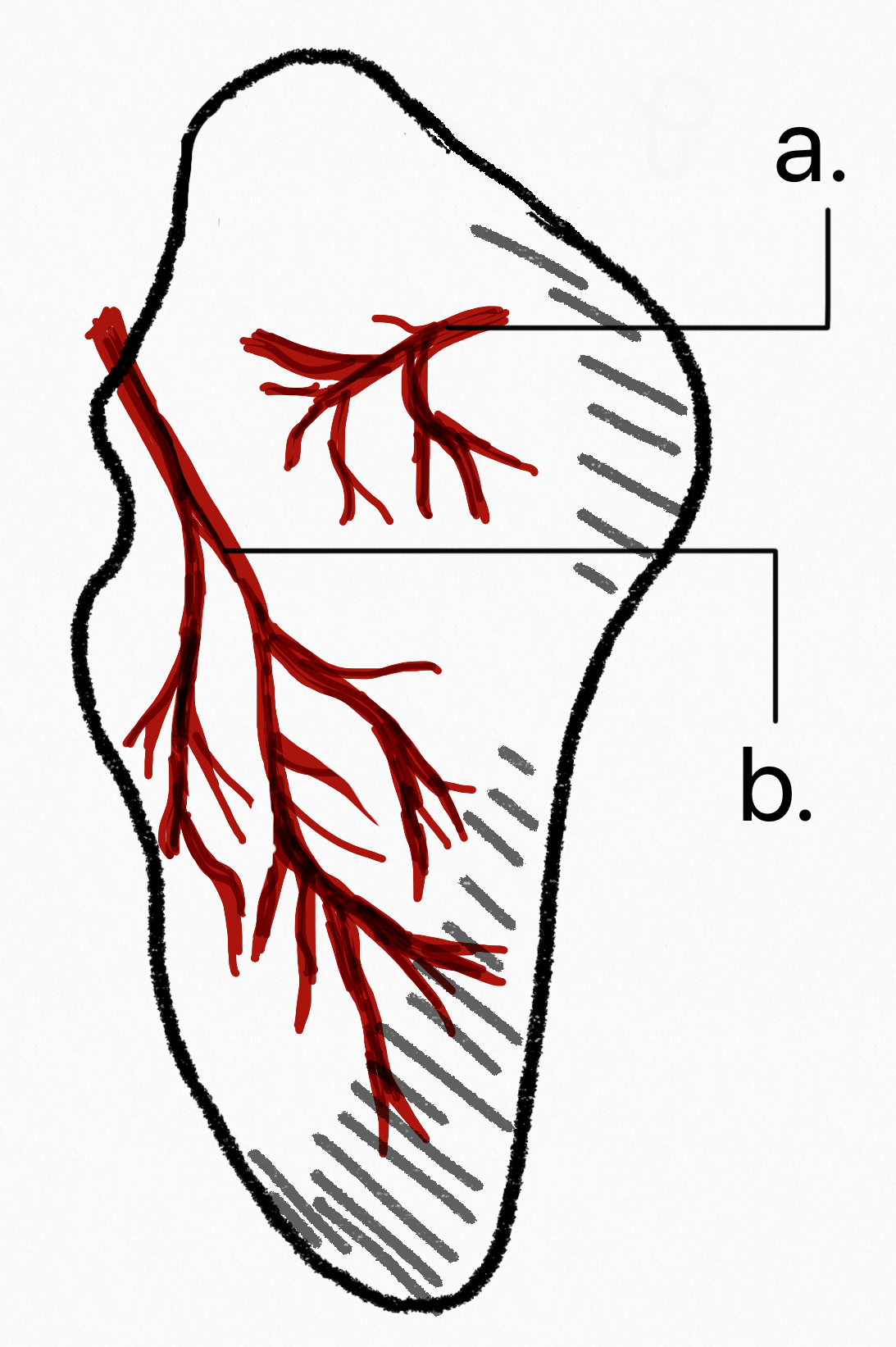
Vascular supply of the scaphoid comes from two different vascular pedicles. 20-30% of the blood supply (a.) comes from the volar branch of the radial artery and enters the bone at the tubercle. 70-80% comes from (b.) the dorsal branch of the radial artery and travels towards the proximal pole.

Avascular necrosis (AVN) is one complication of scaphoid fracture. Since the scaphoid receives its arterial supply in a retrograde fashion (i.e. from distal to proximal pole), the part proximal to the fracture is usually affected.

Risk of AVN depends on the location of the fracture.

- Fractures in the proximal third have a high incidence of AVN (~30%)
- Waist fractures in the middle third is the most frequent fracture site and has moderate risk of AVN.
- Fractures in the distal third are rarely complicated by AVN.

Non union can also occur from undiagnosed or undertreated scaphoid fractures. Arterial flow to the scaphoid enters via the distal pole and travels to the proximal pole. This blood supply is tenuous, increasing the risk of nonunion, particularly with fractures at the wrist and proximal end. If not treated correctly non-union of the scaphoid fracture can lead to wrist osteoarthritis.

Symptoms may include aching in the wrist, decreased range of motion of the wrist, and pain during activities such as lifting or gripping. If x-ray results show arthritis due to an old break, the treatment plan will first focus on treating the arthritis through anti-inflammatory medications and wearing a splint when an individual feels pain in the wrist. If these treatments do not help the symptoms of arthritis, steroid injections to the wrist may help alleviate pain. Should these treatments not work, surgery may be required.

== Mechanism ==
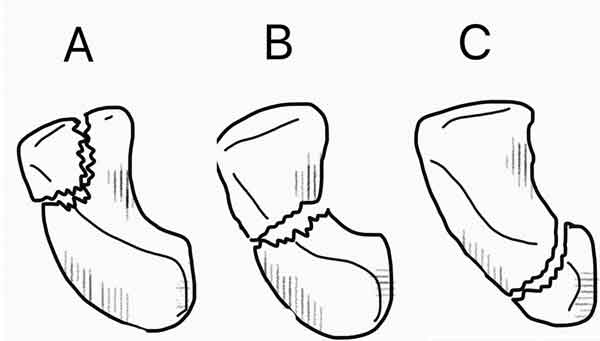
Scaphoid fractures occur in three locations: (A) Distal tubercle, (B) waist, and (C) proximal pole.

Fractures of scaphoid can occur either with direct axial compression or with hyperextension of the wrist, such as a fall on the palm on an outstretched hand. Using the Herbert classification system, there are three main types of scaphoid fractures. 10%-20% of fractures are at the proximal pole, 60%-80% are at the waist (middle), and the remainder occur at the distal pole.

== Diagnosis ==
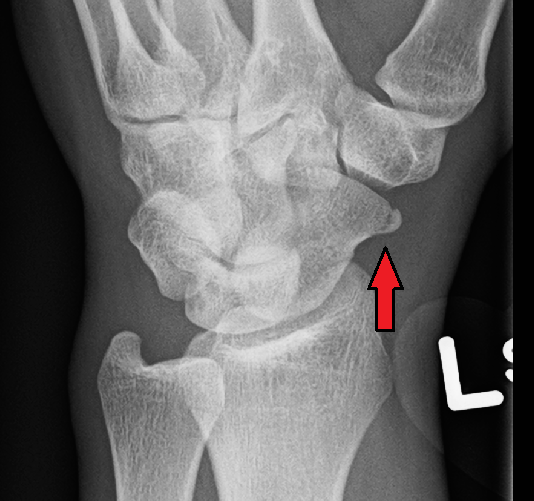
Fracture of the tubercle of the scaphoid bone of the wrist

Scaphoid fractures are often diagnosed using plain radiographs and multiple views are obtained as standard. However, not all fractures are apparent initially. In 1/4 of cases, the clinical examination suggests a fracture, but the X-ray does not show it, even though there is indeed a fracture. Therefore, people with tenderness over the scaphoid (those who exhibit pain to pressure in the anatomic snuff box) are often splinted in a thumb spica for 7–10 days at which point a second set of X-rays is taken. If a minimally displaced fracture was present initially, healing will now be apparent. Even then a fracture may not be apparent. A CT Scan can then be used to evaluate the scaphoid with greater resolution. The use of MRI, if available, is preferred over CT and can give one an immediate diagnosis. Bone scintigraphy is also an effective method for diagnosis fracture which do not appear on Xray.

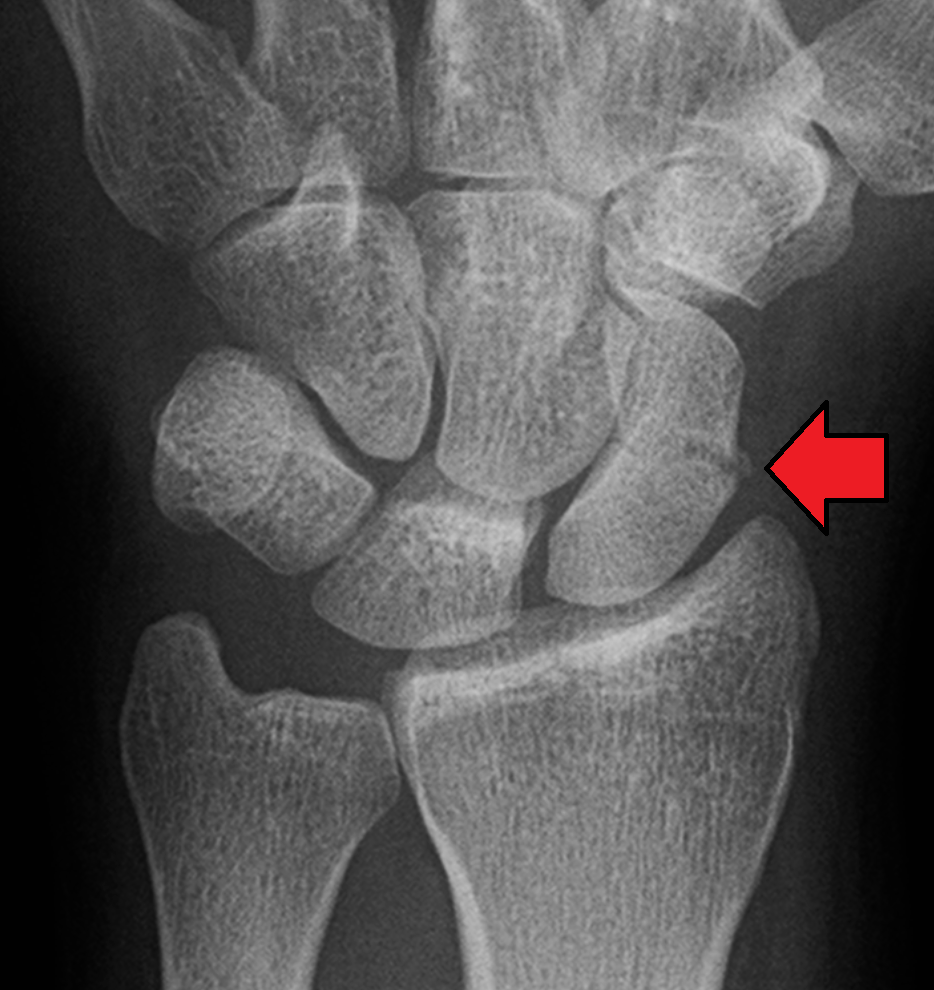
A subtle scaphoid fracture

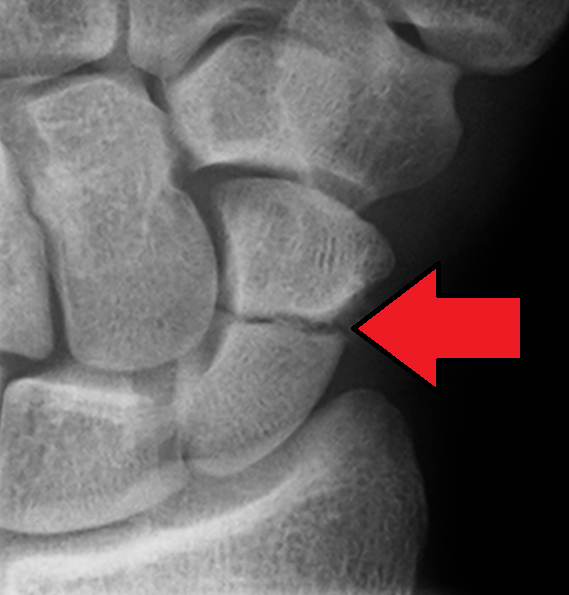
A more obvious scaphoid fracture on a scaphoid view X ray

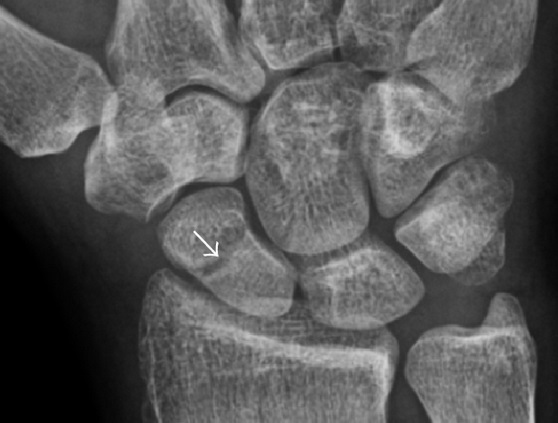
Radiolucency around a 12 days old scaphoid fracture that was initially barely visible.

== Treatment ==
Treatment of scaphoid fractures is guided by the location in the bone of the fracture (proximal, waist, distal), displacement (or instability) of the fracture, and patient tolerance for cast immobilization.

For non and minimally displaced fractures (up to 2mm) of the scaphoid waist, cast immobilisation (with surgical fixation for non-united fractures at 6 to 12 weeks) is as effective as immediate surgery fixation and results in less complications. The choice of short arm, short arm thumb spica or long arm cast is debated in the medical literature and no clear consensus or proof of the benefit of one type of casting or another has been shown; although it is generally accepted to use a short arm or short arm thumb spica for non displaced fractures.

Fractures that are more proximal take longer to heal. It is expected the distal third will heal in 6 to 8 weeks, the middle third will take 8–12 weeks, and the proximal third will take 12–24 weeks. The scaphoid receives its blood supply primarily from lateral and distal branches of the radial artery. Blood flows from the top/distal end of the bone in a retrograde fashion down to the proximal pole; if this blood flow is disrupted by a fracture, the bone may not heal. Surgery is necessary at this point to mechanically mend the bone together.

Percutaneous screw fixation is recommended over an open surgical approach when it is possible to achieve acceptable bone alignment closed as minimal incisions can preserves the palmar ligament complex and local vasculature, and help avoid soft tissue complications. This surgery includes screwing the scaphoid bone back together at the most perpendicular angle possible to promote quicker and stronger healing of the bone. Internal fixation can be done dorsally with a percutaneous incision and arthroscopic assistance or via a minimal open dorsal approach, or via a volar approach in which case slight excavation of the edge of the trapezium bone may be necessary to reach the scaphoid as 80% of this bone is covered with articular cartilage, which makes it difficult to gain access to the scaphoid.

== Prognosis ==
A non-union (pseudarthrosis) can occur in 2 to 5% of cases.

In the aftermath, 90% of non-operated individuals return to sports, with 88% reaching their previous level. Among those who underwent surgery, the rate of returning to sports is 98%, and 96% return to their previous level. The average time observed for resuming sports is 14 weeks for non-operated individuals and 7 weeks for those who had surgery.

== Epidemiology ==
Fractures of the scaphoid are common in young males. They are less common in children and older adults because the distal radius is weaker contributor to the wrist and more likely to fracture in these age groups. Scaphoid fractures account for 50%-80% of carpal injuries.

== Terminology ==
These are also called navicular fractures (the scaphoid also being called the carpal navicular), although this can be confused with the navicular bone in the foot.
