= Ulnar collateral ligament injury of the thumb =

Gamekeeper's thumb
- Other names: UCL tear
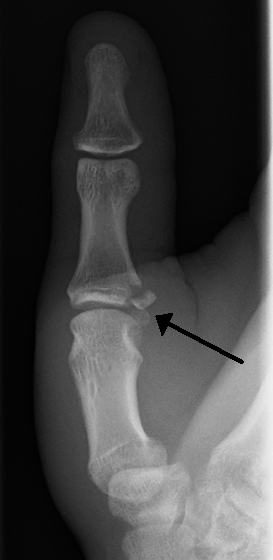
- Avulsion fractures of the ulnar base of the proximal phalanx of the thumb ( Gamekeeper's fracture )
- Specialty: Hand surgery, orthopedics

Gamekeeper's thumb (also known as skier's thumb or UCL tear) is a type of injury to the ulnar collateral ligament (UCL) of the thumb. The UCL may be merely stretched, or it may be torn from its insertion site into the proximal phalanx of the thumb. This condition is commonly observed among gamekeepers and Scottish fowl hunters, as well as athletes (such as volleyballers and football goalkeepers). It also occurs among people who sustain a fall onto an outstretched hand while holding a rod, frequently skiers grasping ski poles.

== Signs and symptoms ==
Symptoms of gamekeeper's thumb are instability of the MCP joint of the thumb, accompanied by pain and weakness of the pinch grasp. The severity of the symptoms is related to the extent of the initial tear of the UCL (in the case of skier's thumb), or how long the injury has been allowed to progress (in the case of gamekeeper's thumb).

Characteristic signs include pain, swelling, and ecchymosis around the thenar eminence, and especially over the MCP joint of the thumb. Physical examination demonstrates instability of the MCP joint of the thumb.

The patient will often manifest a weakened ability to grasp objects or perform such tasks as tying shoes and tearing a piece of paper. Other complaints include intense pain experienced upon catching the thumb on an object, such as when reaching into a pants pocket.

== Diagnosis ==
Gamekeeper's thumb and skier's thumb are two similar conditions, both of which involve insufficiency of the ulnar collateral ligament (UCL) of the thumb. The chief difference between these two conditions is that skier's thumb is generally considered to be an acute condition acquired after a fall or similar abduction injury to the metacarpophalangeal (MCP) joint of the thumb, whereas gamekeeper's thumb typically refers to a chronic condition which has developed as a result of repeated episodes of lower-grade hyperabduction over a period of time. There are four types of Skier's thumb injury:

- Avulsion of distal UCL causing the pulling off of a bone chip off the proximal phalanx base.
- Partial-thickness tear of the UCL
- Full-thickness tear of the middle part of the UCL
- Full-thickness tear of the middle part of the UCL with the proximal fragment displaced superficial to the aponeurosis of adductor pollicis, thus preventing the healing of proximal and distal segments of UCL. This condition is called Stener lesion.

Gamekeeper's thumb is more difficult to treat because the UCL has lengthened and become thinner as a result of repeated injury. It is moderately painful compared to similar injuries.

In addition to skiing, this injury (resulting from forced abduction or hyperextension of the proximal phalanx of the thumb) is seen in a wide variety of other athletic endeavors. The most common mechanism of injury appears to be when a person extends the arm in an attempt to block a fall. The stress resulting from falling onto an abducted thumb produces a valgus force on the MCP joint of the thumb, resulting in a sprain or tear of the UCL.

On ultrasound, a displaced tear of the ulnar collateral ligament demonstrates the "yo-yo on a string" sign, in which the retracted, balled-up proximal end of the torn ulnar collateral ligament (the "yo-yo") is seen displaced superficial to the adductor aponeurosis (the "string"). This sign allows sonographic differentiation between a non-displaced UCL tear, which may heal conservatively, and a displaced tear requiring surgical repair.

In a recent study, 49% of UCL disruptions of the thumb were caused by a fall onto an outstretched hand. Sports injuries accounted for most of the remaining injuries, with only 2.4% acquired as a result of skiing injuries.

== Treatment ==
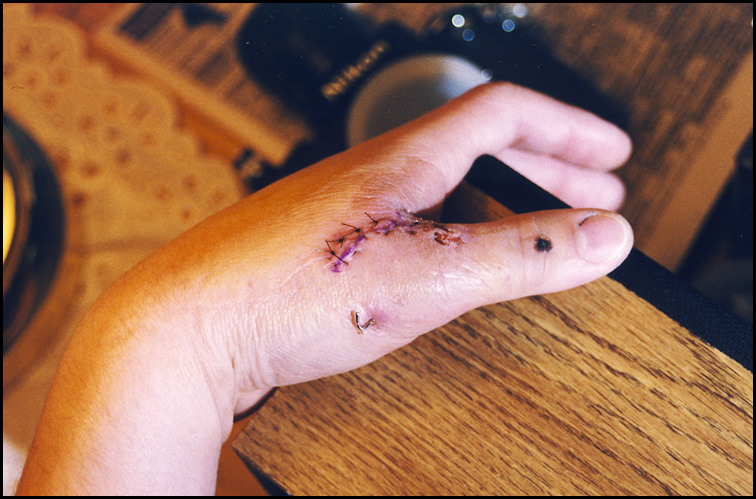
A post-operative photo of repair of a complete rupture of the ulnar collateral ligament. Note the K-wire to brace the joint.

The ulnar collateral ligament is an important stabilizer of the thumb. Thumb instability resulting from disruption of the UCL profoundly impairs the overall function of the involved hand. Because of this, it is critical that these injuries receive appropriate attention and treatment.

In most cases of a complete tear, the aponeurosis of the adductor pollicis muscle may be interposed between the bones of the MCP joint and the torn ligament. When this condition (referred to as a Stener lesion) occurs, the adequate healing of the tear is prevented altogether. For a Stener lesion to occur, a complete tear of the ulnar collateral ligament must be present. However, the Stener lesion can occur even in the absence of a tear of the accessory collateral ligament or volar plate. The Stener lesion is present in more than 80% of complete ruptures of the UCL of the thumb.

When approaching this type of injury, the physician must first determine whether there is an incomplete rupture (or sprain) of the UCL, or a complete rupture. If the UCL is completely disrupted, the physician must then determine whether there is interposition of the adductor aponeurosis (Stener lesion), or simply a complete rupture of the UCL with anatomic or near-anatomic position. Radiographs are helpful in determining the possible presence of an avulsion fracture of the proximal phalanx insertion site of the ulnar collateral ligament. Stress examination, or one done under fluoroscopic guidance, can help determine the integrity of the ligament.

Most gamekeeper's thumb partial injuries are treated by simply immobilizing the joint in a thumb spica splint or a modified wrist splint and allowing the ligament to heal. However, near total or total tears of the UCL may require surgery to achieve a satisfactory repair, especially if accompanied by a Stener lesion.

== History ==
CS Campbell, an orthopedic surgeon, originally coined the term gamekeeper's thumb in 1955, after he observed this condition in a series of 24 Scottish gamekeepers. The injury appeared to occur as a result of the particular manner in which they killed small animals such as rabbits; the animals were placed on the ground, and their necks were broken as the gamekeeper exerted downward pressure with the thumb and index finger. This maneuver would place a valgus force upon the abducted metacarpophalangeal (MCP) joint. Over time, this would lead to insufficiency of the ulnar collateral ligament (UCL) of the thumb.

Others have noted that Scottish fowl or game hunters would develop this type of injury after carrying their game home in a leather thong, which they would attach to their thumb and drape over their shoulder.

The term skier's thumb is derived from the fact that skiers often acquire this type of injury by falling against a planted ski pole, tearing the UCL by hyperabducting it.

== See also ==
- Bennett's fracture
- Rolando fracture
