= Ulnar collateral ligament injury of the elbow =

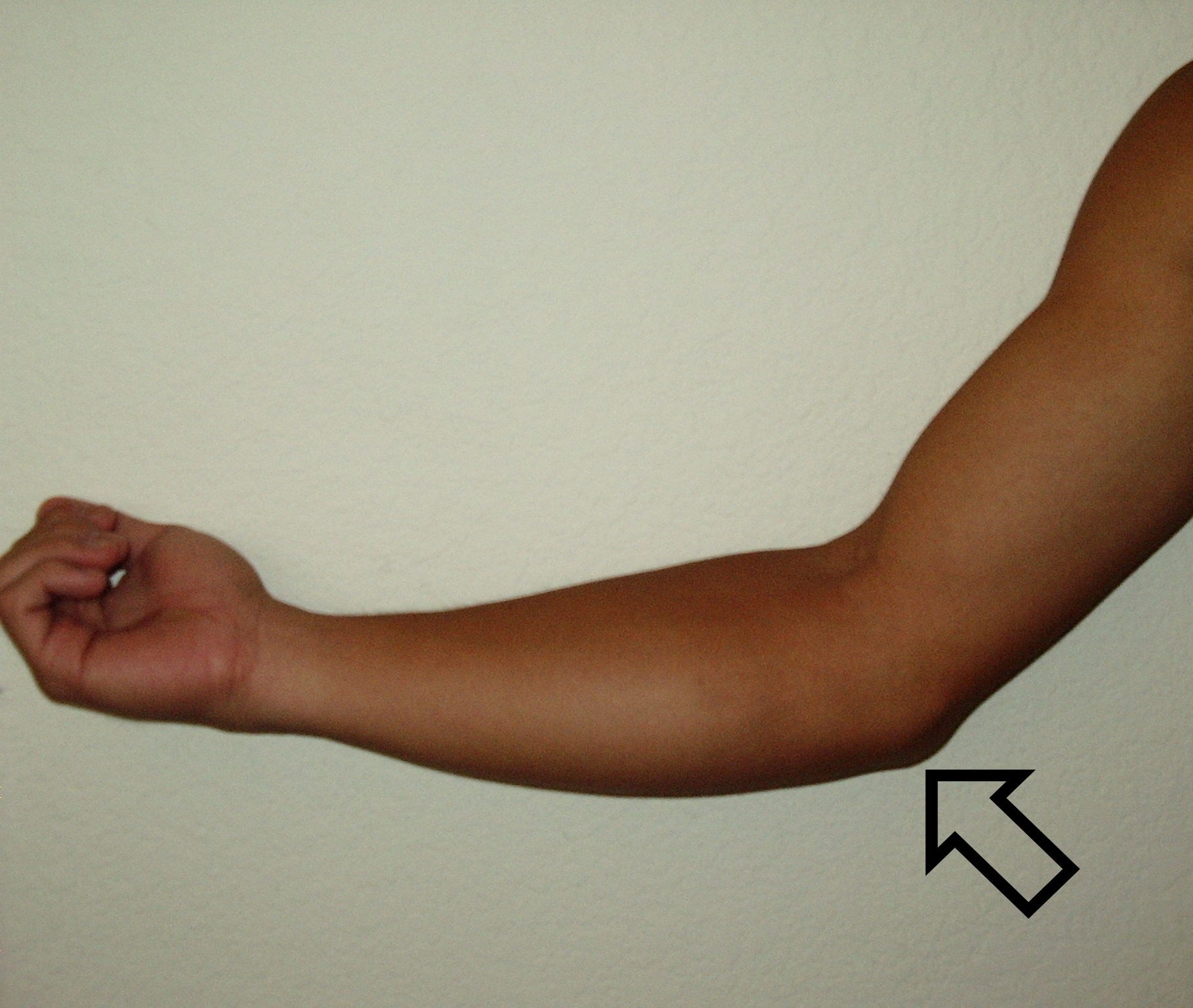
- Location of UCL injury
- Specialty: Orthopedics

Ulnar collateral ligament injuries can occur during certain activities such as overhead baseball pitching. Acute or chronic disruption of the ulnar collateral ligament result in medial elbow pain, valgus instability, and impaired throwing performance. There are both non-surgical and surgical treatment options.

== Signs and symptoms ==
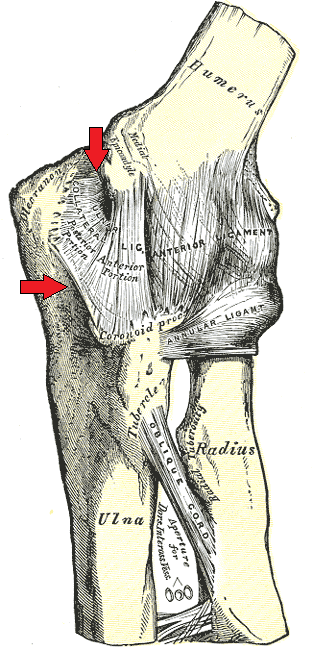
Ligaments of the left elbow. Red arrows mark the location of the UCL.

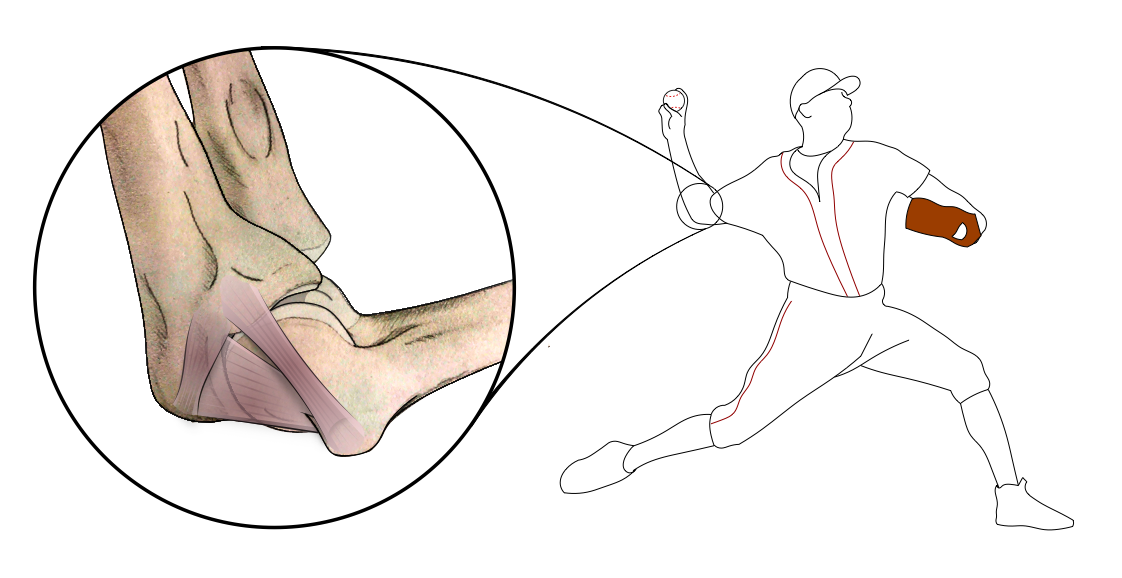
Anatomy of the ulnar collateral ligament in the pitcher's elbow

Pain along the inside of the elbow is the main symptom of this condition. Throwing athletes report it occurs most often during the acceleration phase of throwing. The injury is often associated with an experience of a sharp "pop" in the elbow, followed by pain during a single throw. In addition, swelling and bruising of the elbow, loss of elbow range of motion, and a sudden decrease in throwing velocity are all common symptoms of a UCL injury. If the injury is less severe, pain can alleviate with complete rest.

== Causes ==
The UCL stabilizes the elbow from being abducted during a throwing motion. If intense or repeated bouts of valgus stress occur on the UCL, injury may occur. Damage to the UCL is common among baseball pitchers and javelin throwers because the throwing motion is similar. Physicians believe repetitive movements, especially pitching in baseball, cause UCL injuries. Furthermore, physicians have stated that if an adolescent throws over 85 throws for 8 months or more in a year, or throws when exhausted, the adolescent has a significantly higher risk of UCL injury.

Gridiron football, racquet sports, ice hockey and water polo players have also been treated for damage to the UCL. Specific overhead movements like those that occur during baseball pitching, tennis serving or volleyball spiking increase the risk of UCL injury. During the cocking phase of pitching, the shoulder is horizontally abducted and externally rotated, and the elbow is flexed. There is slight stress on the UCL in this position but it increases when the shoulder is further externally rotated in a throw. The greater the stress the more the UCL is stretched causing strain. During the overhead throwing motion, valgus stress on the medial elbow occurs during arm cocking and acceleration. The initiation of valgus stress occurs at the conclusion of the arm-cocking phase. In the transitional moment from arm cocking to arm acceleration, the shoulder vigorously rotates internally, the forearm is in near full supination, and the elbow flexes from 90° to approximately 125°. From late cocking to ball release, the elbow rapidly extends from approximately 125° to 25° at ball release. This causes extreme valgus stress and tensile strain on the UCL.

Injuries to the UCL may result from poor throwing mechanics, overuse, high throwing velocities, and throwing certain types of pitches, such as curveballs. Poor mechanics along with high repetition of these overhead movements can cause irritation, microtears or ruptures of the UCL. Kinetic chain dysfunction due to poor lower extremity strength, core strength and stability can be associated with UCL injuries, as well as capsular stiffness in glenohumeral internal rotation deficit (GIRD), and scapular dyskinesis. Injuries to the UCL in baseball players are rarely due to one-time, traumatic events. Rather, they more often occur due to small chronic strains and tears accumulating over time.

== Anatomy ==
The ulnar collateral ligament (UCL, also known as medial collateral ligament) is located on the medial side of the elbow. The UCL complex comprises three ligaments: the anterior oblique, posterior oblique and transverse ligaments. The anterior oblique ligament (AOL) attaches from the undersurface of the medial epicondyle to the medial ulnar surface slightly below the coronoid process. It is the sturdiest of the three sections within the UCL. The AOL acts as the primary restraint against valgus stress at the elbow during flexion and extension. The posterior oblique originates at the medial epicondyle and inserts along the mid-portion of the medial semilunar notch. It applies more stability against valgus stress when the elbow is flexed rather than extended. The transverse ligament connects to the inferior medial coronoid process of the ulna to the medial tip of the olecranon. Since it is connected to the same bone and not across the elbow joint, the transverse ligament has no contribution to the joint's stability.

== Diagnosis ==
In most cases, a physician will diagnose an ulnar collateral ligament injury using a patient's medical history and a physical examination that includes a valgus stress test. The valgus stress test is performed on both arms and a positive test is indicated by pain on the affected arm that is not present on the uninvolved side. Physicians often use imaging techniques such as ultrasound, x-rays and magnetic resonance imaging or arthroscopic surgery to aid with making a proper diagnosis.

=== Classification ===
A slow and chronic deterioration of the ulnar collateral ligament can be due to repetitive stress acting on the ulna. At first, pain can be bearable and can worsen to an extent where it can terminate an athlete's career. The repetitive stress placed on the ulna causes microtears in the ligament resulting in the loss of structural integrity over time. The ulnar collateral ligament has three bands: anterior, posterior, and transverse. The anterior band is the primary stabilizer against valgus stress, particularly during the late cocking and early acceleration phases of throwing.

The acute rupture is less common compared to the slow deterioration injury. The acute rupture occurs in collisions when the elbow is in flexion such as that in a wrestling match or a tackle in football. The ulnar collateral ligament distributes over fifty percent of the medial support of the elbow. This can result in an UCL injury or a dislocated elbow causing severe damage to the elbow and the radioulnar joints.

== Treatments ==
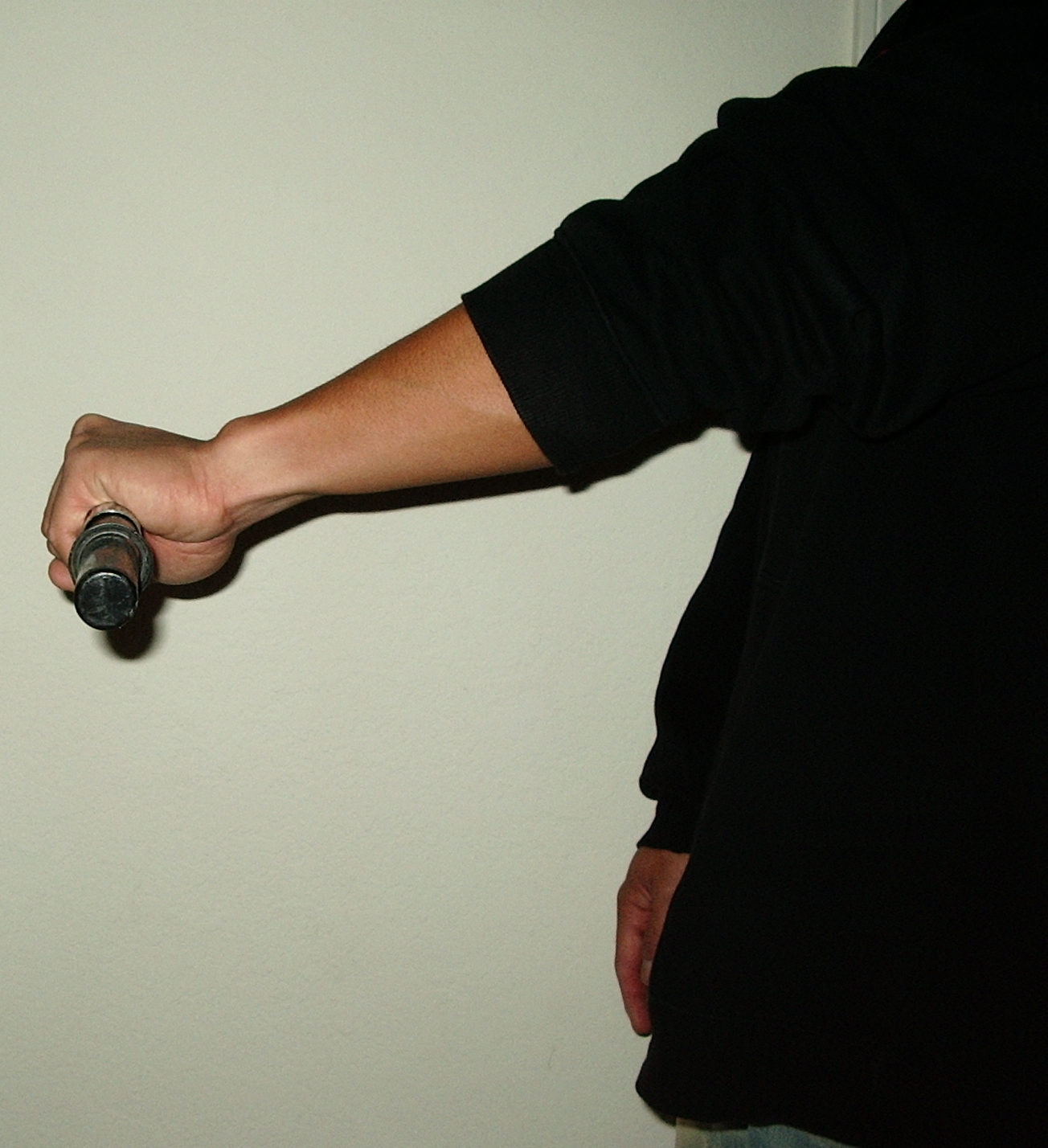
Pronating forearm

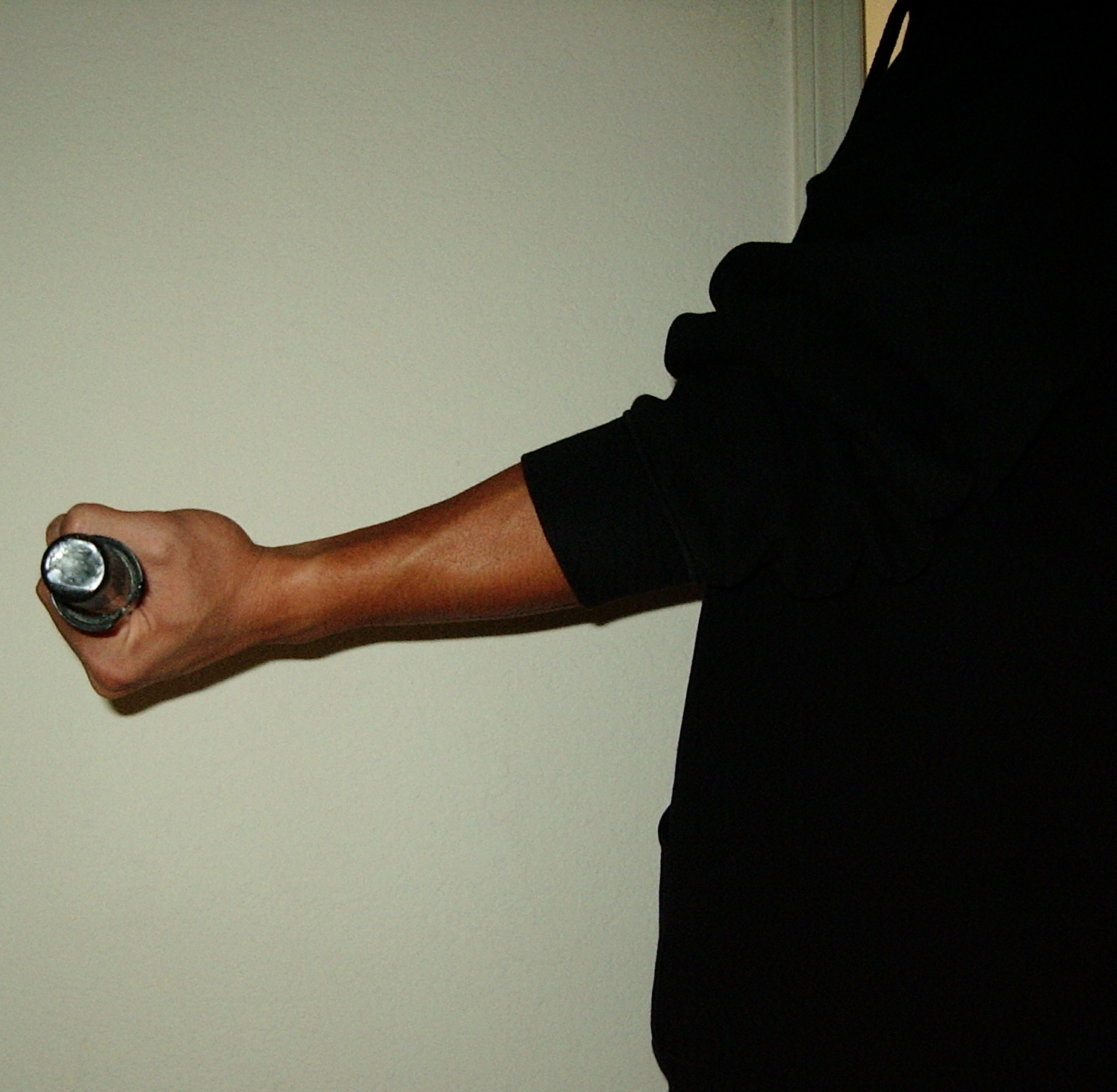
Supination exercise

UCL injuries may or may not require surgery. Non-surgical treatment will primarily focus on strengthening the elbow joint to regain strength and stability. First a course of RICE (rest, ice, compression, elevation) is typically coupled with NSAIDS to help alleviate pain and swelling. When the swelling has subsided, individual exercises or physical therapy may be prescribed to strengthen muscles around the elbow joint to compensate for tearing in the UCL. These may include biceps curls (non resistance and resistance), pronating and supinating the forearm, and grip strengthening exercises, performed with low resistance and moderate repetitions no more than three times a week. Exercises such as active range of motion wrist exercises like extension and flexion, along with grip strength motions can build up the tiny muscles around the UCL.

Surgical treatment may help restore the ability to perform the overhand throwing motions most commonly associated with UCL injuries. The reconstructive surgery, generally known as Tommy John surgery, was first performed by Dr. Frank Jobe in 1974 and has been modified several times since then. The surgery involves an autograft of the palmaris longus tendon (mostly considered an accessory tendon) or an allograft of tissue from a cadaver or donor. The replacement tendon is attached by drilling holes in the medial epicondyle of the humerus and the sublime tubercle of the ulna and lacing the tendon through them in a figure eight.

In recovery from surgery, the person may begin physical therapy shortly after. It usually takes 12–15 months after the surgery for standard rehabilitation because a tendon needs time to convert into a ligament. In addition, according to the systematic review of the Preferred Reporting Items for (PRISMA) guidelines, the overall weighted mean time to start full active or unlimited ROM was 40 days, with nonoperative injuries (36 days) starting full or unlimited active ROM sooner than operative injuries (41 days) on average.

Rehabilitation following UCL injuries or surgery should follow a sequential and progressive multi-phased approach that involves a gradual and protected return of range-of-motion. The rehab program should include proprioceptive exercises to stimulate mechanoreceptors as well as arm strengthening, emphasizing proximal scapular stabilization. Low-resistance, high-repetition programs promote an optimal return to uncompensated throwing. Post-operative treatment is related to the restoration of normal scapulohumeral rhythm, which begins with establishing trunk stability, elbow range of motion and strength as well as balance exercises. Rehabilitation is an important component for managing UCL injuries and is typically performed in phases. Early stages focus on protecting the ligament, decreasing pain, and restoring range of motion while avoiding valgus stress. Intermediate phases introduce strengthening, particularly of the flexor and pronator muscles for dynamic medial elbow stability. Later phases emphasize advanced strengthening, neuromuscular control, and kinetic chain integration, including the shoulder and scapular stabilizers, to decrease ay stress on the elbow during functional or sport-related activities.

A 2015 study found that MLB pitchers who had Tommy John surgery returned to pitch in MLB 83% of the time and only 3% failed to return to pitch in MLB or the minor leagues.

Beginning in 2007, there was an increase in the numbers of Tommy John surgeries. The increase was related to the false perception that the surgery improved the stability of the UCL joint. Many athletes believed this false perception, so they lied about their symptoms hoping to undergo the surgery. In order to combat the rumors, physicians were motivated to educate the public that Tommy John surgeries are only for those who have severe UCL injuries. The surgery will have an insignificant effect if the patient does not have a severe UCL injury.

A non-operative process consisting of physical therapy or physical therapy combined with platelet-rich plasma injections found that the rate of returning to overall sports participation was about 80% while the rate of returning to the previous level of play was about 78%.

Rehabilitation following ulnar collateral ligament (UCL) reconstruction (Tommy John surgery) is a structured, multi-phase process that focuses on restoring range of motion (ROM), strength, neuromuscular control, and gradual return to sport-specific activity.Early rehabilitation emphasizes protection of the graft and restoration of elbow ROM, particularly extension. Strengthening initially targets the wrist flexor-pronator, which provides dynamic medial elbow stability. Progressive strengthening includes the shoulder, scapular stabilizers, and kinetic chain to reduce valgus stress on the elbow during throw. A structured throwing program is initiated several months postoperatively, progressing from short-distance, low-intensity throws to full-effort pitching. Return-to-sport timelines vary, but competitive throwing athletes often require approximately 9–18 months before returning to pre-injury performance levels. Evidence-based rehabilitation protocols emphasize gradual loading, biomechanical correction, and monitoring for symptoms to minimize reinjury.

== Epidemiology ==
According to the International Classification of Diseases, 9th Revision, Clinical Modification, ICD-9-CM, in 2008 the U.S. listed the diagnosis code for UCL injury as 841.1: Sprain ulnar collateral ligament. There were 336 discharges of UCL injuries. Within the total discharges, separated by age groups, were 18- to 44-year-olds: 165 people (49.17%); 45- to 64-year-olds: 91 (27.08%); and 65- to 84-year-olds: 65 (19.35%). It shows that the UCL injuries were more commonly found in men than women. There were 213 men compared to 123 women with UCL injury. Most of these injuries were paid through private insurance (170: 50.63%) and Medicare (70: 20.85%). The average estimated cost for the surgery was $21,563 in 2012.
