= Spica splint =

Type of orthopedic splint

A spica splint is a type of orthopedic splint used to immobilize the thumb and/or wrist while allowing the other digits freedom to move. It is used to provide support for thumb injuries (ligament instability, sprain or muscle strain), gamekeeper's thumb, osteoarthritis, de Quervain's syndrome or fractures of the scaphoid, lunate, or first metacarpal.

The term "spica splint" (also known as "thumb spica splint") refers to immobilization of the lateral aspect of the thumb. There are multiple variations of the splint including short-arm thumb spica, long-arm thumb spica, and prefabricated braces. These splints can be constructed using plaster, fiberglass, or fabric. Splints can be used for definitive intervention in milder, soft-limiting injuries. They may also be used as a pre-surgical immobilization measure, post-operatively, or for temporary use following removal of a hand/thumb cast.

== Indications ==
=== Carpometacarpal thumb osteoarthritis ===
Also known as basal joint arthritis, carpometacarpal thumb OA is a degenerative condition of the thumb that causes pain, stiffness, and weakness. Risk factors include repetitive hand use, female, middle aged, and previous injury to the thumb. Diagnosis is confirmed with x-ray imaging. Conservative management for this condition includes thumb immobilization, activity modification, physical therapy, and anti-inflammatories. Temporary spica splints are used to immobilize the thumb and reduce pain, especially during activities that require extensive use of the hand. Studies have shown improvement in pain scores with long-term thumb spica use (greater than three months).

=== Soft-tissue injuries ===
==== De quervain's tenosynovitis ====
This syndrome happens as a result of injury to the first dorsal compartment of the hand due to overuse or repetitive movements of the thumb. This injury presents as pain and swelling over the first dorsal compartment as well as a positive Finkelstein's test. Conservative management consists of immobilization, rest, and anti-inflammatories. Temporary thumb immobilization prevents overuse of the first dorsal compartment musculature as the inflammation resolves. Several studies have noted the effectiveness of temporary thumb spica splinting in conjunction with glucocorticoid injections and non-steroidal anti-inflammatories.

==== Gamekeeper's thumb (UCL Injury) ====
Also known as skier's thumb, this injury occurs following forceful thumb abduction and hyperextension, resulting in damage to the thumb ulnar collateral ligament. These injuries typically present as pain over the ulnar aspect of the thumb at the level of the metacarpophalangeal (MCP) joint which is exacerbated with thumb extension or abduction. The patient may have difficulty pinching or grasping objects with that hand. This injury is typically self-limiting and improves with non-operative measures such as immobilization with a spica splint, analgesics, cold therapy, or glucocorticoid injection. Splint use for this condition is considered palliative and helps to provide comfort while allowing the tendinopathy to resolve.

=== Fractures ===
==== Scaphoid ====
Accounting for up to 89% of all carpal fractures, scaphoid fractures are one of the most common injuries of the wrist. This injury usually results from a fall onto an outstretched hand and presents as pain over the anatomic snuffbox. Scaphoid fractures may not be evident on initial x-ray imaging, therefore CT or repeat x-ray images within 10-14 days of injury is suggested. Temporary immobilization with a thumb spica splint is the main treatment, even if the fracture is not initially evident on radiographs. Immobilization of the thumb reduces fracture movement as the bone heals. If the fracture is displaced and requires surgical fixation, temporary spica splinting may also be utilized to provide comfort and prevent further fracture movement.

==== 1st Metacarpal ====
Although there are many different patterns of 1st metacarpal fractures, these injuries are usually the result of axial loading of a partially flexed thumb. Inadequate reduction and immobilization of these fractures can result in early-onset osteoarthritis, thereby making immobilization via spica splinting a critical part of management. Diagnosis is achieved through plain radiographs. Nondisplaced or minimally displaced fractures are amendable to spica splinting for 3-6 weeks with follow-up radiographs.

== Complications ==
One complication is compartment syndrome, a painful condition caused by an increase in pressures within a closed muscular compartment, compromising blood flow and circulation to that compartment. Most commonly occurs in the lower extremities as a result of traumatic injury. However, this condition can also occur in the upper extremities due to iatrogenic causes, such as splinting or casting. An intracompartmental pressure of 30 mmHg or greater is diagnostic. Common symptoms include worsening pain, skin color changes, numbness, tingling, or paralysis. Compartment syndrome is a surgical emergency and requires immediate attention.

Patients may also experience thermal burns secondary to the exothermic reaction of the plaster or other splinting material. This can be avoided by using cool or tepid water when activating the plater material. This can also be avoided by adequately protecting the skin from the splinting material with padding and stockinette.

Other complications of splinting include skin irritation or breakdown and joint stiffness. A properly fitted splint with suitable padding and close follow-up with a healthcare provider will help minimize these complications.
