= Ulnar collateral ligament of thumb =

Ligament of the thumb

Ulnar collateral ligament (thumb)
- From: First metacarpal head
- To: Volar aspect of proximal phalanx of the thumb

The ulnar collateral ligament of the thumb runs along the ulnar side of the metacarpo-phalangeal joint of the thumb. The ulnar collateral ligament is an important stabilizer of the thumb.

It is on the radial side of the wrist, but on the ulnar side of the thumb. It should not be confused with the ulnar collateral ligament of wrist joint.

== Clinical significance ==
Injuries to it cause instability and loss of function of the thumb. Acutely this injury is known as the Skier's thumb or if the result of chronic injury Gamekeeper's thumb.
