= Valgus stress test =

Medical diagnostic method

The valgus stress test or medial stress test is a test for damage to the medial collateral ligament of the knee. It involves placing the leg into extension, with one hand placed as a pivot on the knee. With the other hand placed upon the foot applying an abducting force, an attempt is then made to force the leg at the knee into valgus. If the knee is seen to open up on the medial side, this is indicative of medial collateral ligament damage and may also indicate capsular or cruciate ligament laxity.

There are two versions of this test: valgus at 0 degrees and valgus at 30 degrees. When performing the test at 30 degrees, the MCL is the primary stabilizer; the joint capsule is also tested. When tested at 0 degrees, the MCL, medial joint capsule, and anterior and posterior cruciate ligaments are stressed.
