= Repetitive strain injury =

Muscular, skeletal, or nerve injury due to repetitive actions

- Other names: Cumulative trauma disorders, repetitive stress injuries, repetitive motion injuries or disorders, occupational or sports overuse syndromes
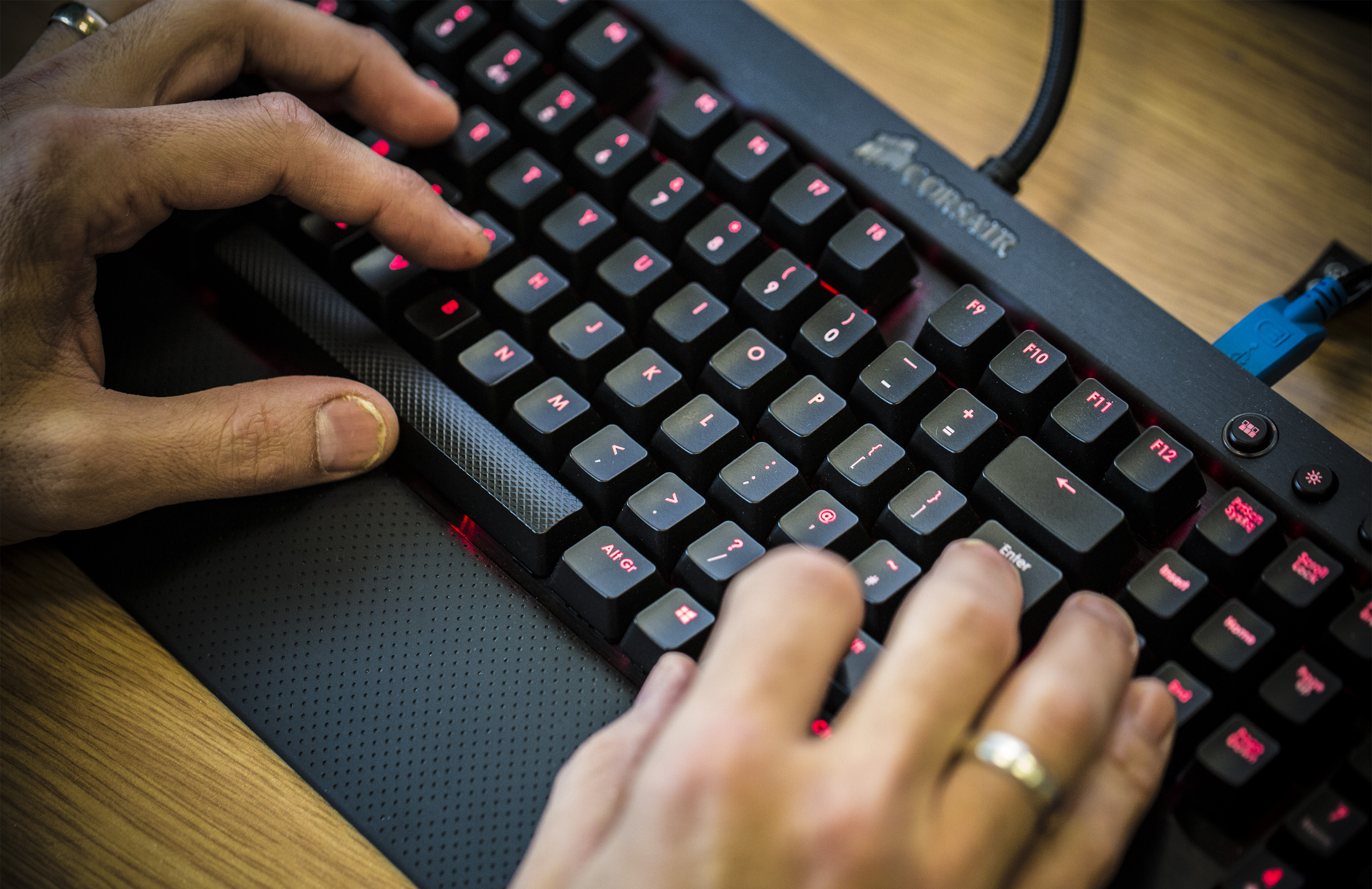
- Poor ergonomic techniques by computer users are one of many potential causes of repetitive strain injury.
- Specialty: Sports medicine, performing arts medicine, orthopedics
- Symptoms: Sore wrists, aching, pulsing pain, tingling, extremity weakness
- Complications: Torn ligaments
- Causes: Repetitive actions, poor technique
- Risk factors: Sedentary lifestyle, smoking, alcohol consumption
- Prevention: Proper technique, regular rests, regular exercise

A repetitive strain injury (RSI) is an injury to part of the musculoskeletal or nervous system caused by repetitive use, vibrations, compression or long periods in a fixed position. Other common names include repetitive stress injury, repetitive stress disorders, cumulative trauma disorders, and overuse syndrome.

== Signs and symptoms ==
Some examples of symptoms experienced by patients with RSI are aching, pulsing pain, tingling and extremity weakness, initially presenting with intermittent discomfort and then with a higher degree of frequency.

== Definition ==
Repetitive strain injury (RSI) and associative trauma orders are umbrella terms used to refer to several discrete conditions that can be associated with repetitive tasks, forceful exertions, vibrations, mechanical compression, sustained or awkward positions, or repetitive eccentric contractions. The exact terminology is controversial, but the terms now used by the United States Department of Labor and the National Institute of Occupational Safety and Health are musculoskeletal disorders and work-related musculoskeletal disorders.

Examples of conditions that may sometimes be attributed to such causes include tendinosis (or less often tendinitis), carpal tunnel syndrome, cubital tunnel syndrome, De Quervain syndrome, thoracic outlet syndrome, intersection syndrome, golfer's elbow (medial epicondylitis), tennis elbow (lateral epicondylitis), trigger finger (so-called stenosing tenosynovitis), radial tunnel syndrome, ulnar tunnel syndrome, and focal dystonia.

A general worldwide increase since the 1970s in RSIs of the arms, hands, neck, and shoulder has been attributed to the widespread use in the workplace of keyboard entry devices, such as typewriters and computers, which require long periods of repetitive motions in a fixed posture. Specific sources of discomfort have been popularly referred to by terms such as Blackberry thumb, PlayStation thumb, Rubik's wrist or "cuber's thumb", stylus finger, raver's wrist, and Emacs pinky. Extreme temperatures have also been reported as risk factor for RSI.

== Risk factors ==
=== Occupational risk factors ===
Workers in certain fields are at risk of repetitive strains. Most occupational injuries are musculoskeletal disorders, and many of these are caused by cumulative trauma rather than a single event. Miners and poultry workers, for example, must make repeated motions which can cause tendon, muscular, and skeletal injuries. Jobs that involve repeated motion patterns or prolonged posture within a work cycle, or both, may be repetitive. Young athletes are predisposed to RSIs due to an underdeveloped musculoskeletal system.

=== Psychosocial factors ===
Psychological factors include personality differences concerning work-place organization problems. Certain workers may negatively perceive their work organization due to excessive work rate, long work hours, limited job control, and low social support. Studies show elevated urinary catecholamines (stress-related chemicals) in workers with RSI. Pain related to RSI may evolve into chronic pain syndrome, particularly for workers who do not have supports from coworkers and supervisors.

=== Non-occupational factors ===
Age and gender are important risk factors for RSIs. The risk of RSI increases with age. Women are more likely affected than men because of their smaller frame, lower muscle mass and strength, and endocrine influences. In addition, lifestyle choices such as smoking and alcohol consumption are recognizable risk factors for RSI. Recent scientific findings indicate that obesity and diabetes may predispose an individual to RSIs by creating a chronic low grade inflammatory response that prevents the body from effectively healing damaged tissues.

== Diagnosis ==
RSIs are assessed using a number of objective clinical measures. These include effort-based tests such as grip and pinch strength, diagnostic tests such as Finkelstein's test for De Quervain's tendinitis, Phalen's contortion, Tinel's percussion for carpal tunnel syndrome, and nerve conduction velocity tests that show nerve compression in the wrist. Various imaging techniques can also be used to show nerve compression such as x-ray for the wrist, and MRI for the thoracic outlet and cervico-brachial areas. Utilization of routine imaging is useful in early detection and treatment of overuse injuries in at risk populations, which is important in preventing long term adverse effects.

== Treatment ==
Physical Ergonomy: the science of designing the job, equipment, and workplace

There are no quick fixes for repetitive strain injuries. Early diagnosis is critical to limiting damage. For upper limb RSIs, occupational therapists can create interventions that include teaching the correct approaches to functional task movements in order to minimize the risk of injury. The RICE (Rest, Ice, Compression, Elevation) treatment is used as the first treatment for many muscle strains, ligament sprains, or other bruises and injuries. RICE is used immediately after an injury happens and for the first 24 to 48 hours after the injury. These modalities can help reduce the swelling and pain. Commonly prescribed treatments for early-stage RSIs include analgesics, myofeedback, biofeedback, physical therapy, relaxation, intermittent vacuum therapy and ultrasound therapy. Low-grade RSIs can sometimes resolve themselves if treatments begin shortly after the onset of symptoms. However, some RSIs may require more aggressive intervention including surgery and can persist for years.

Although there are no "quick fixes" for RSI, there are effective approaches to its treatment and prevention. One is that of ergonomics, the changing of one's environment (especially workplace equipment) to minimize repetitive strain.

A 2006 Canadian study found exercise in leisure time was strongly associated with decreased risk of developing an RSI. Doctors sometimes recommend that those with RSI engage in specific strengthening exercises, for example to improve sitting posture, reduce excessive kyphosis, and potentially thoracic outlet syndrome. Modifications of posture and arm use are often recommended.

== History ==
Although seemingly a modern phenomenon, RSIs have long been documented in the medical literature. In 1700, the Italian physician Bernardino Ramazzini first described RSI in more than 20 categories of industrial workers in Italy, including musicians and clerks. Carpal tunnel syndrome was first identified by the British surgeon James Paget in 1854. The April 1875 issue of The Graphic describes "telegraphic paralysis."

The Swiss surgeon Fritz de Quervain first identified De Quervain's tendinitis in Swiss factory workers in 1895. The French neurologist Jules Tinel (1879–1952) developed his percussion test for compression of the median nerve in 1900. The American surgeon George Phalen improved the understanding of the etiology of carpal tunnel syndrome with his clinical experience of several hundred patients during the 1950s and 1960s.

== See also ==
- Computer vision syndrome
- Ergonomic keyboard
- List of repetitive strain injury software
- Maltron
- Microsoft ergonomic keyboards
- Overtraining
