= Climbing injuries =

Injuries caused by climbing

Injuries in rock climbing may occur due to overuse or falls (see Sports injury). However, injuries due to falls are relatively uncommon; the vast majority of injuries result from overuse, most often occurring in the fingers, elbows, and shoulders. Such injuries are often no worse than torn calluses, cuts, burns and bruises. But overuse symptoms, if ignored, may lead to permanent damage (esp. to tendons, tendon sheaths, ligaments, and joint capsules).

== Risk groups ==
The climbers most prone to overuse injuries are intermediate to expert within lead climbing or bouldering, since these disciplines are the most athletic in nature.

== Overuse injuries in climbing ==
In terms of overuse injuries a British study found that:

- 40% occurred in the fingers
- 16% in the shoulders
- 12% in the elbows
- 5% in the knees
- 5% in the back
- 4% in the wrists

One injury that tend to be very common among climbers is Carpal tunnel syndrome. It is found in about 25% of climbers.

=== Finger injuries ===
604 injured rock climbers were prospectively evaluated from January 1998 to December 2001, due to the rapid growth of new complex finger trauma in the mid-1980s. Of the most frequent injuries, three out of four were related to the fingers: pulley injuries accounted for 20%, tendovaginitis for 7%, and joint capsular damage for 6.1%.

==== Pulleys ====
Damage to the flexor tendon pulleys that encircle and support the tendons that cross the finger joints is the most common finger injury within the sport (see climber's finger). The main culprit for pulley-related injuries is the common crimp grip, especially in the closed position. The crimp grip requires a near ninety-degree flexion of the middle finger joint, which produces a tremendous force load on the A2 pulley. Injuries to the A2 pulley can range from microscopic to partial tears and, in the worst case, complete ruptures. Some climbers report hearing a pop, which might be a sign of a significant tear or complete rupture, during an extremely heavy move (e.g. tiny crimp, one- or two-finger pocket). Small partial tears, or inflammation can occur over the course of several sessions.

- Grade I – Sprain of the finger ligaments (collateral ligaments), pain locally at the pulley, pain when squeezing or climbing.
- Grade II – Partial rupture of the pulley tendon. Pain locally at the pulley, pain when squeezing or climbing, possible pain while extending your finger.
- Grade III – Complete rupture of the pulley, causing bowstringing of the tendon. Symptoms can include: Pain locally at the pulley (usually sharp), may feel/hear a 'pop' or 'crack', swelling and possible bruising, pain when squeezing or climbing, pain when extending your finger, pain with resisted flexion of the finger.

Climbers recovering from pulley injuries rely on the RICE protocol: Rest, Ice, Compression, and Elevation. Sufficient rest, ice to reduce swelling, compression for support, and hand elevation collectively foster an ideal healing environment. There is also some research supporting the use of taping, especially concerning bowstringing, but more research is needed.

==== Knuckle ====
- Stress fractures
- Collateral ligament injuries

=== Shoulder injuries ===
Shoulder related injuries include rotator cuff tear, strain or tendinitis, biceps tendinitis and SLAP lesion.

=== Elbow injuries ===
Tennis elbow (Lateral Epicondylitis) is a common elbow injury among climbers, as is Golfer's elbow (Medial Epicondylitis, which is similar, but occurs on the inside of the elbow).

=== Calluses, dry skin ===
Climbers often develop calluses on their fingers from regular contact with the rock and the rope. When calluses split open they expose a raw layer of skin that can be very painful. This type of injury is commonly referred to as a flapper.

The use of magnesium carbonate (chalk) for better grip dries out the skin and can often lead to cracked and damaged hands

There are a number of skincare products available for climbers that help to treat calluses, moisturize dry hands, and reduce recovery time.

== Young/adolescent climbers ==
"Any finger injury that is sustained by a young adolescent (12–16) should be seen by a physician and have x-rays performed. These skeletally immature athletes are very susceptible to developing debilitating joint arthritis later in adulthood."

== See also ==
- Related topics
  - Carpal tunnel syndrome
  - Climber's finger
  - Golfer's elbow
  - Repetitive strain injury
  - Radial tunnel syndrome
  - Tennis elbow
- Lists and glossaries
  - List of climbing topics
  - Climbing terminology
  - Climbing command
