= Extensor tendon compartments of the wrist =

Parts of the wrist

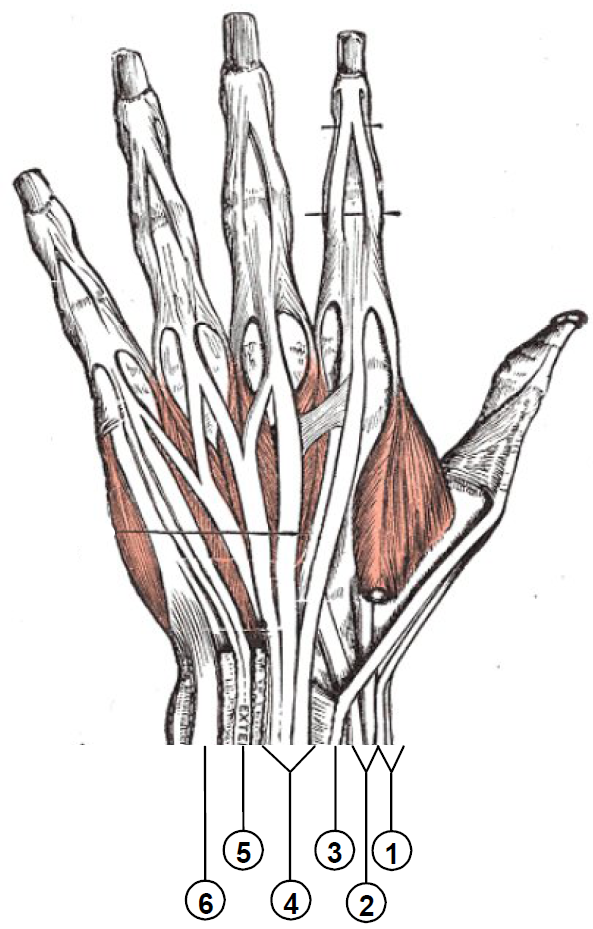
- Drawing of the back of the wrist showing the extensor compartments

Extensor tendon compartments of the wrist are anatomical tunnels on the back of the wrist that contain tendons of muscles that extend (as opposed to flex) the wrist and the digits (fingers and thumb).

The extensor tendons are held in place by the extensor retinaculum. As the tendons travel over the posterior (back) aspect of the wrist they are enclosed within synovial tendon sheaths. These sheaths reduce the friction to the extensor tendons as they traverse the compartments that are formed by the attachments of the extensor retinaculum to the distal (far end) of the radius and ulna.

== Structure ==
The compartments are numbered with each compartment containing specific extensor tendons.

Compartment	Component(s)	Function(s)	Associated pathology
1	Abductor pollicis longus tendon Extensor pollicis brevis tendon	Thumb abduction and extension at metacarpophalangeal joint Forms radial (thumb side) border of the anatomical snuff box	De Quervain's tenosynovitis
2	Extensor carpi radialis longus tendon Extensor carpi radialis brevis tendon	Extension of wrist	Intersection syndrome
3	Extensor pollicis longus tendon	Separated from the third compartment by Lister's tubercle Forms ulnar (little finger side) border of the anatomical snuff box Extension of interphalangeal joint of thumb	Drummer's wrist
4	Extensor digitorum tendons Extensor indicis tendon	Extension of the medial four digits	Fourth compartment syndrome
5	Extensor digiti minimi tendon	Positioned directly over the distal radioulnar joint Extensor digiti minimi usually has double tendon in the fifth compartment upon inserting onto the little finger	Vaughn-Jackson syndrome
6	Extensor carpi ulnaris tendon	The tendon runs within the groove of ulnar head Extension and adduction of wrist	Snapping extensor carpi ulnaris

== Clinical significance ==
Any of the dorsal compartments of the wrist can develop tenosynovial inflammation. The first compartment is the most frequently affected site, called De Quervain's disease (syndrome or tenosynovitis). The other two most commonly injured are the sixth (extensor carpi ulnaris) and second (intersection syndrome) compartments.

The first compartment is the site where entrapment tendinitis, better known as De Quervain's disease, occurs. Repetitive trauma is believed to cause thickening of the tendons, which lead to movement restriction of the tendons through the compartment. Any movement of the thumb and wrist causes the patient pain, inflammation and swelling.

The presence of anomalous or variant muscles in the fourth compartment may result in chronic dorsal wrist pain, a condition known as the fourth compartment syndrome.

Intersection syndrome can be caused by direct trauma to the second extensor compartment. It is however commonly brought on by activities that require repetitive wrist flexion and extension. Weightlifters, rowers, and other athletes are particularly prone to this condition. The patient presents with pain over dorsal aspect of the forearm and wrist.

The tendon of 6th compartment (extensor carpi ulnaris) can suffer recurrent dislocation due to a tear of the ulnar side of the compartment. Those that engage in racket sports and golf seem to be at the highest risk for this condition.

== Additional images ==
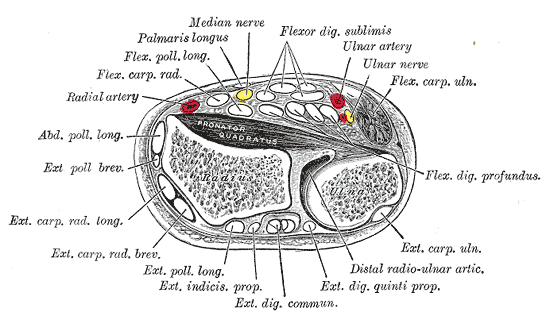
Cross section of wrist showing six extensor compartments of hand
