= Vinculum (ligament) =

Anatomical structure

In anatomy, a vinculum (pl.: vincula) is a band of connective tissue, similar to a ligament, that connects a flexor tendon to a phalanx bone. They contain tiny vessels which supply blood to the tendon. In vertebrate anatomy, they are referred to as mesotendons.

For example, in the fingers and toes of humans and related vertebrates, vincula are responsible for the direct vascularization of the flexor digitorum superficialis and profundus tendons to the intermediate and distal phalanges in each finger. These vincula are four folds in the synovial membrane that carry blood vessels to the body and insertion of the tendon. The tendon receives some additional nutrition directly from the synovial fluid in the sheath, which is important in case of partial loss of direct vascularization from the vincula.

In the chick, vincula are much larger and more complex than in humans. Though they contain blood vessels, these only make up a very limited portion of the total mass of the vincula, most of which consists of collagen and elastic fibres.

== See also ==
- Vinculum (insect anatomy)
- Vincula tendina
