= Tenosynovitis =

Inflammation of the fluid sheath (synovium) around a tendon

- Other names: tendosynovitis
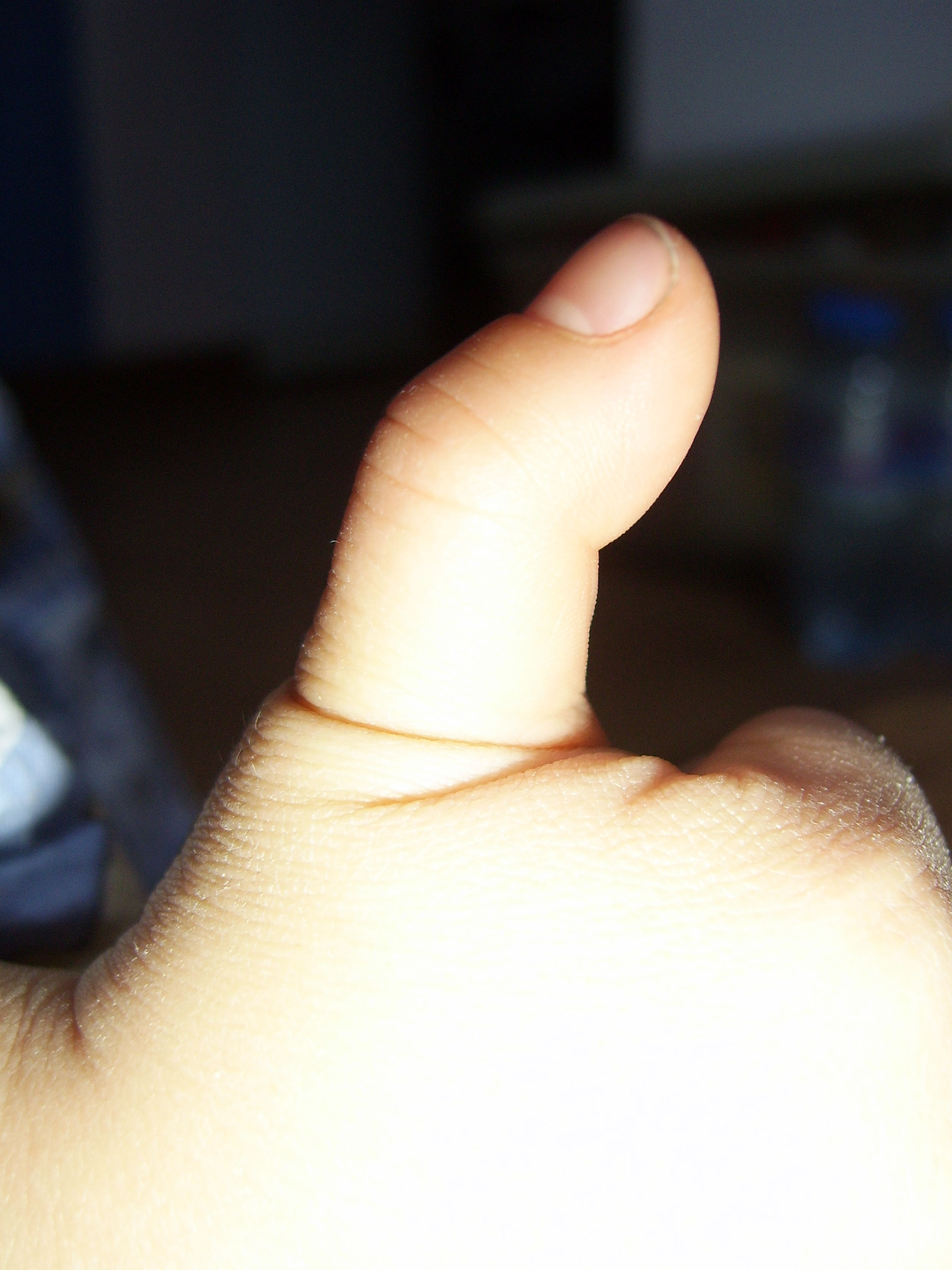
- Congenital stenosing tenosynovitis of the thumb in a 3-year-old child. The thumb is unable to be straightened.
- Specialty: Physical medicine and rehabilitation

Tenosynovitis is the inflammation of the fluid-filled sheath (called the synovium) that surrounds a tendon, typically leading to joint pain, swelling, and stiffness. Tenosynovitis can be either infectious or noninfectious. Common clinical manifestations of noninfectious tenosynovitis include de Quervain tendinopathy and stenosing tenosynovitis (more commonly known as trigger finger).

== Signs and symptoms ==
Infectious tenosynovitis in 2.5% to 9.4% of all hand infections. Kanavel's cardinal signs are used to diagnose infectious tenosynovitis. They are: tenderness to touch along the flexor aspect of the finger, fusiform enlargement of the affected finger, the finger being held in slight flexion at rest, and severe pain with passive extension. Fever may also be present, but is uncommon.

== Pathogenesis ==
Infectious tenosynovitis is the infection of closed synovial sheaths in the flexor tendons of the fingers. It is usually caused by trauma, but bacteria can spread from other sites of the body. Although tenosynovitis usually affects the flexor tendon of the fingers, the disease can also affect the extensor tendons occasionally. The clinical presentation is therefore as acute infection following trauma. The infection can be mono- or polymicrobial and can vary depending on the nature of the trauma. The most common pathogenic agent is Staphylococcus aureus introduced from the skin. Other bacteria linked to infectious tenosynovitis include Pasteurella multocida (associated with animal bites), Eikenella spp. (associated with IV drug use), and Mycobacterium marinum (associated with wounds exposed to fresh or salt water). Additionally, sexually active patients are at risk for hematogenous spread due to Neisseria gonorrhoeae (see infectious arthritis).

Common noninfectious tenosynovitis are: stenosing tenosynovitis, intersection syndrome, extensor pollicis longus (EPL) tenosynovitis, de Quervain's and fourth compartment tenosynovitis.

== Diagnosis ==
Diagnosis of tenosynovitis is typically made clinically after a thorough patient history and physical exam. Aspirated fluid can also be cultured to identify the infectious organism. X-rays are typically unremarkable but can help rule out a broken bone or a foreign body

== Treatment ==
The mainstay of treatment for infectious tenosynovitis includes symptom relief, antibiotic therapy, and surgery. Early recognition of the disease with early initiation of antibiotics are important for better range of movement of the affected finger. Minimally invasive procedures into the flexor tendon sheath such as catheter irrigation give better outcomes (74% chance of good outcome) when compared to open surgery (26% chance of good outcome). However, wound irrigation with antibiotics has no clear benefits. Most infectious tenosynovitis cases should be managed with tendon sheath irrigation and drainage, with or without debridement of surrounding necrotic tissue, along with treatment with broad-spectrum antibiotics. In severe cases, amputation may even be necessary to prevent the further spread of infection. Following surgical intervention, antibiotic therapy is continued and adjusted based on the results of the fluid culture.

== Prognosis ==
The earlier the condition is identified, the better the chance of getting full range of motion of the finger. However, finger stiffness, Boutonniere deformity, deep space infection, tendon necrosis, adhesions, persistent infection, and need for amputation of the finger can occur. Tendon adhesion and finger stiffness are caused by the violation of the flexor tendon sheath.

== See also ==
- Synovitis
- DeQuervain's syndrome
- Remitting seronegative symmetrical synovitis with pitting edema
