= Lead climbing injuries =

Rock climbing health

The greatest potential for injury while rock climbing occurs when a lead climber falls. Several published studies have researched climbing injuries, especially lead climbing injuries, and how to avoid them. Chances of neck and head injuries are very low and they can be avoided by falling correctly.

== Injuries from falling ==
Lead falls are dangerous because the climber can fall twice the length of the rope between them, and their last piece of protection. Thus, a climber, who is 5 feet above their protection, will fall 10 feet. The fall can produce a significant force on the midsection, where the climbing rope is tied to their harness. Injuries from falling come in many forms. They range from mild skin abrasions to death. As rock climbing has become more popular, several studies have been published documenting the frequency and severity of injuries sustained by rock climbers in various circumstances. Each study provides slightly different information due to the differences in methods in obtaining data. One problem with all of the studies is that injuries are not always reported; therefore, it is difficult to determine how many climbers were actually injured because there is no way to determine how many climbers climbed in the given areas during the times the studies were conducted.

== A Prospective Study of Rock Climbing Injuries ==
A Prospective Study of Rock Climbing Injuries, a study performed by Jonathon P. Wyatt, Gordon W. McNaughton, and Patrick T. Grant, registrars and consultants at the Accident and Emergency Department of the Glasgow Royal Infirmary surveyed patients from 1992-93 who checked in with climbing related injuries. While this study greatly lacked subjects, percentages of injuries to various body parts are consistent with studies, which reported more injuries. According to patients, 18 of 19 climbing-related injuries were directly caused by climbing falls. No distinction was made whether the falls were lead falls, or not. 15 climbers fell from the rock face to the ground, implying these were lead falls. Twelve of the 19 injuries sustained were bone fractures, including feet, shins, pelvis and lower back. The remaining seven were soft tissue injuries (ankle, knee, and ligaments). Ten injuries were to the lower extremities (legs and pelvic areas). These included three ankle injuries, three fractures of bones in the calf (tibia and fibula), and two lumbar spine fractures. Most importantly, none of the injuries were neck injuries.

== Falling correctly ==
Falling correctly can significantly reduce the chance of serious injury. Many climbing injuries are caused by climbers who grab something as they fall.

Climbers that grab the ascending rope during a fall can sustain skin damage (from rope burns) on their hands, become caught in the last piece of protection, can unintentionally un-clip the belay point causing longer and more dangerous falls, and become tangled in the climbing rope. Climbers who grab their ropes above the tying knot might have their fingers amputated by the rope constricting around them. Grabbing pieces of protection during a fall can impale the climber's hand.

Someone who climbs 3-4 days a week might take 1000 lead falls a year, which increases the chance of injury because of a fall. However, by practicing the proper falling technique a climber can significantly reduce the chance of injury. Climbers should fall with their hands up and slightly forward and with feet down and slightly forward as well. This method of falling allows the climber to make contact with the wall with limbs that can absorb the force of impact, rather than with other less-absorbent parts of the body. After impact, the climber should grab the rope (as it is completely stretched out and unable to cause injury) in order to refrain from tipping upside down. This method of falling eliminates injuries caused by prematurely grabbing the rope or other pieces of protection, as well as virtually eliminating neck injuries.

== Rock climbing injuries in Yosemite National Park ==
In a 3½-year study performed in Yosemite National Park, California, William S. Bowie, Thomas K. Hunt, and Hubert A. Allen reviewed 451 injuries reported by 220 climbers. These injuries came from a variety of sources, but 144 climbers were injured in lead falls (65.45%).

Research was compiled as climbers were brought to the Yosemite Medical Clinic or were rescued by United States National Park Search and Rescue team. All injured climbers filled out a survey of their injuries. Nearly 227 of the 451 injuries reported were to the skin or subcutaneous tissue (the layer of fat between the skin and underlying tissues). Of the remaining injuries, 127 were to lower extremities including femur, knee, tibia/fibula, ankle, and foot. Twenty-nine were to upper extremities including shoulder, forearm, wrist, and hand. Twenty-five injuries were reported to the skull/brain. Of the remaining injuries, ten were sustained in the face and neck area.

This study also showed that falls are not the cause of injury; it depends on how the climber lands after the falls. The contact surface and shape determine the severity and type of their injuries. For example, in one case of injury, a woman fell 100 feet and only suffered a small laceration and minimal contusions. This is attributed to the fact that she hit no rocks during her fall and the rope decelerated her elastically. Conversely, in another case, a climber fell only 6 feet but hit a sharp ledge and suffered a compound fracture of his femur. In a third case, a climber fell 20 feet but hit the ground and suffered a concussion, rib fractures, and dislocated ankle. Thus, injury severity is likely and more determined by the shape of the rock hit, the angle of impact, and which body surface hit the rock, as opposed to the length of the fall.

This study importantly points out there were a total of thirty-five head and neck-related injuries. Only four injuries related to lead climbing were fatal—all of these were head injuries. However, only 7% of the total injuries reported were head injuries. Thus, it is unlikely, that a climber will break their neck when climbing.

== Conclusion ==
Each of the studies discussed the effects of falling, and How Should a Climber Fall? also taught the best way to fall especially to avoid head and neck injuries. The Yosemite study points out that injury usually is not related to the distance of the fall nor the frequency of falls: it depends more on the rock surface the climber hits. In reviewing these studies of climbing injuries, and focusing mainly on lead climbing injuries, it is apparent that the chance of major injury is relatively slim, that potential injuries to the head and neck are slimmer, and that minor injuries, though more common, seem to be infrequent as well.

== See also ==
- Climbing injuries
