= Finkelstein's test =

Test used to diagnose de Quervain's tenosynovitis

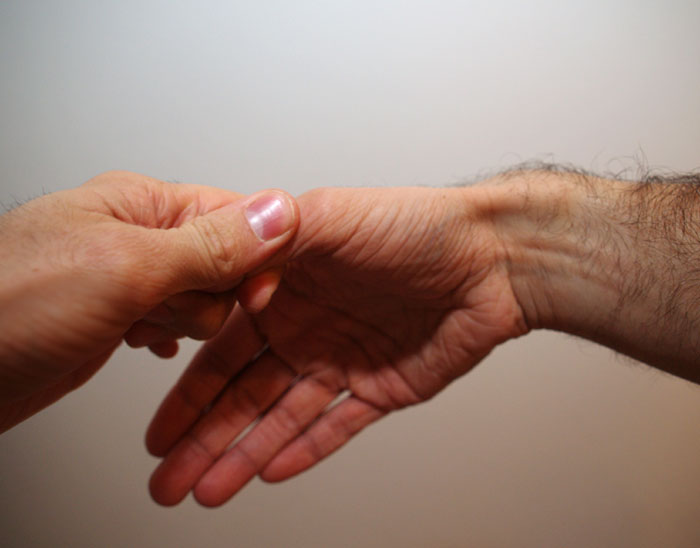
The classic Finkelstein's test

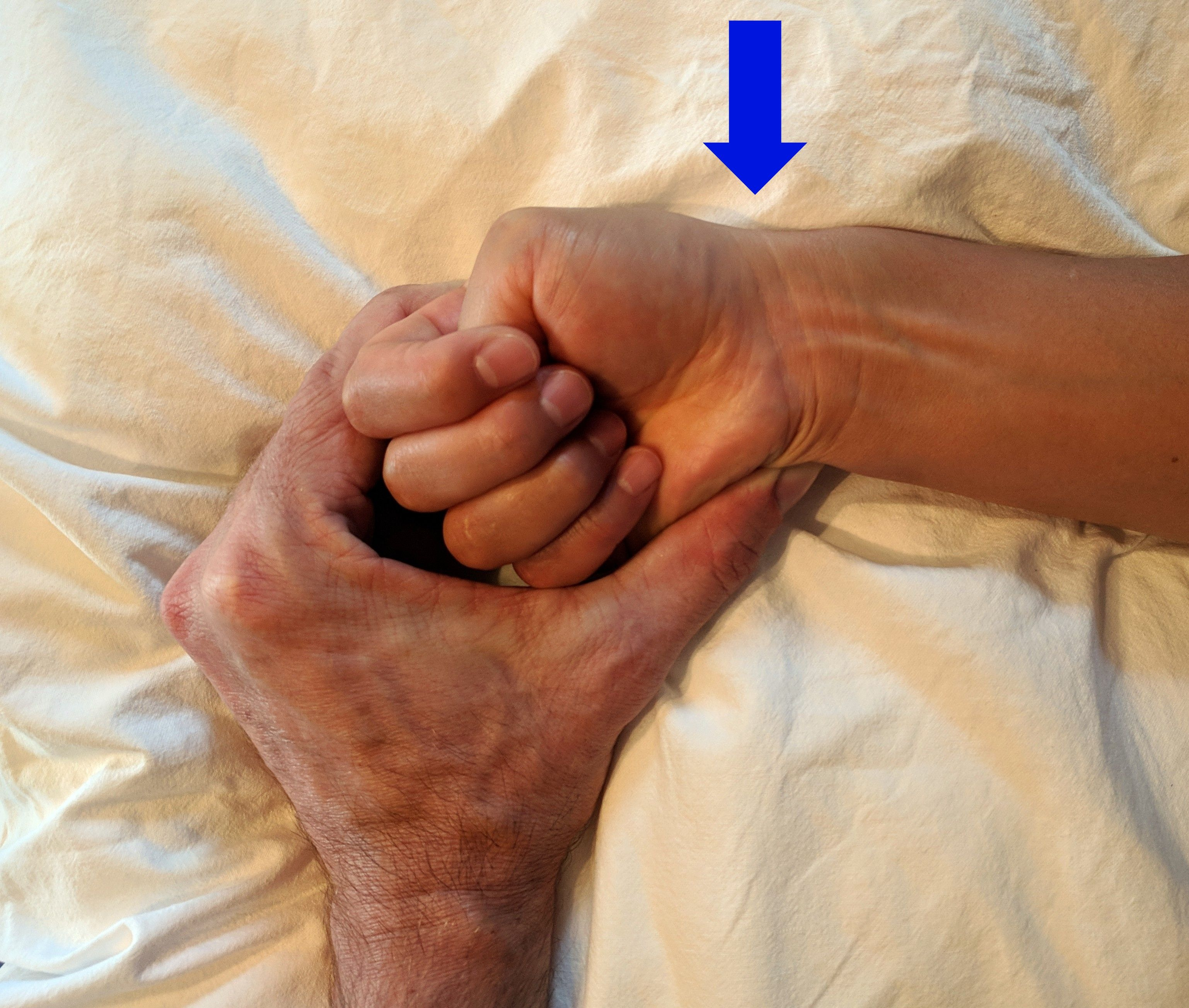
An example of a modified Eichhoff's test. Arrow marks where the pain is worsened.

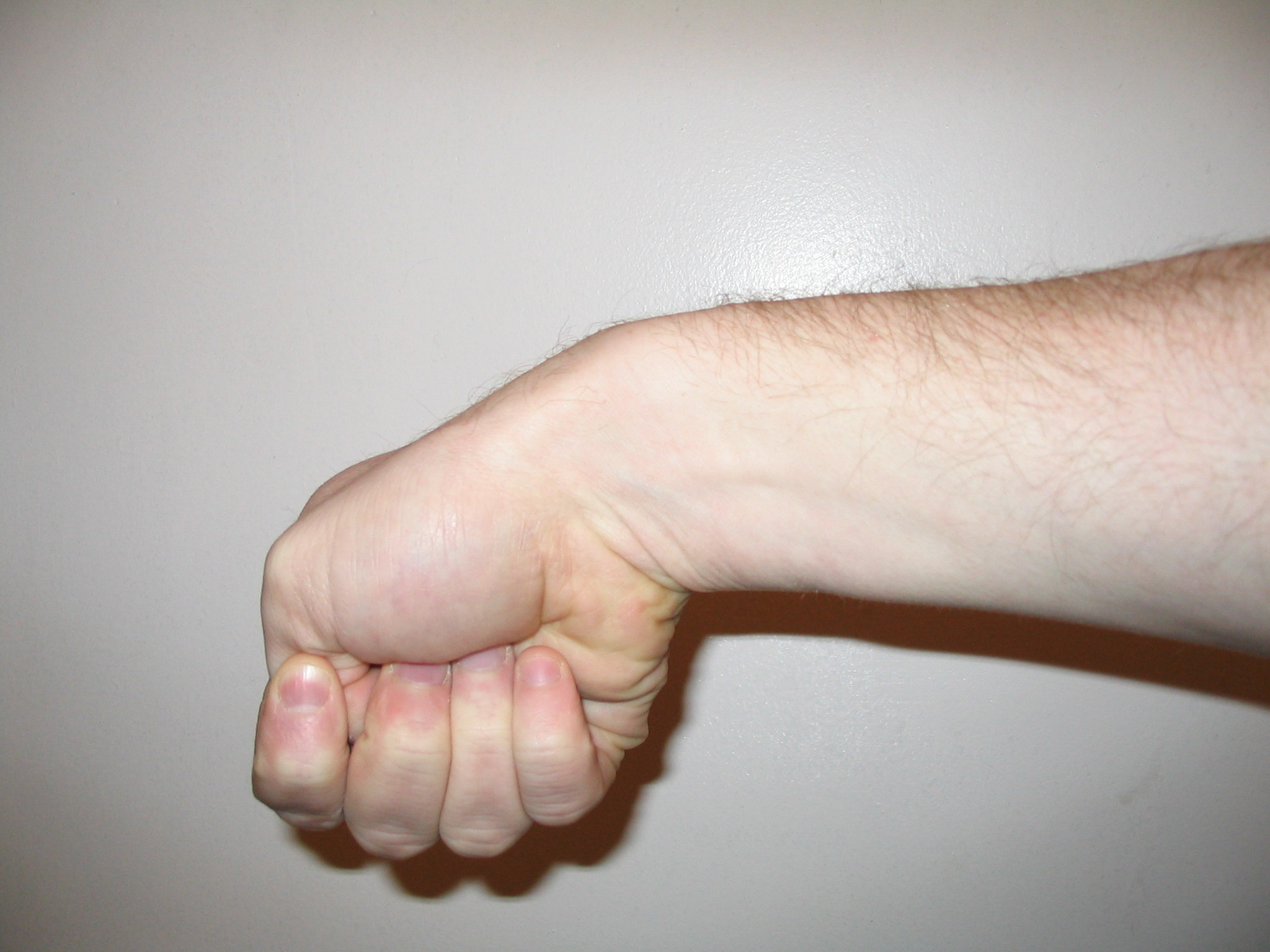
Eichhoff's test for De Quervain's tenosynovitis

Finkelstein's test is a test used to diagnose de Quervain's tenosynovitis in people who have wrist pain.

Classical descriptions of the Finkelstein's test are when the examiner grasps the thumb and ulnar deviates the hand sharply. If sharp pain occurs along the distal radius (top of forearm, close to wrist; see image), de Quervain's tenosynovitis is likely.

Finkelstein's test is commonly confused with Eichhoff's test: the Eichhoff's test is typically described as the examiner grasping and ulnar deviating the hand when the person has their thumb held within their fist. If sharp pain occurs along the distal radius, Quervain's tenosynovitis is suspected.

Eichhoff's test may produce false positive results, while a Finkelstein's test performed by a skilled practitioner is unlikely to produce a false positive.

== Purpose ==
Finkelstein's test is one way to determine if there is tenosynovitis in the abductor pollicis longus and extensor pollicis brevis tendons of the wrist. These two tendons belong to the first dorsal compartment.

- First dorsal compartment: abductor pollicis longus and extensor pollicis brevis.
- Second dorsal compartment: extensor carpi radialis longus and extensor carpi radialis brevis.
- Third dorsal compartment: extensor pollicis longus.
- Fourth dorsal compartment: extensor digitorum and extensor indicis.
- Fifth dorsal compartment: extensor digiti minimi.
- Sixth dorsal compartment: extensor carpi ulnaris.

== History ==
Finkelstein's test was described by Harry Finkelstein (1865–1939), an American surgeon, in 1930.

A similar test was previously described by Eichhoff, in which the thumb is placed in the palm of the hand and held with the fingers, and the hand is then ulnar deviated (see images), causing intense pain over the radial styloid which disappears if the thumb is released. This test produces more false positive results than the test described by Finkelstein.

== Method ==
The examiner pulls the thumb of the patient in ulnar deviation and longitudinal traction. If there is an increased pain in the radial styloid process and along the length of the extensor pollicis brevis and abductor pollicis longus tendons, then the test is positive for de Quervain's syndrome.

== Special considerations/implications ==
Eichhoff's test is commonly mislabeled as being Finkelstein's test. This is significant because Eichhoff's test may create pain in other tissues to come back a false positive or may come back negative though de Quervain's syndrome is still suspected, the patient can radially deviate against resistance to possibly reproduce pain. If performed correctly by the examiner, Finkelstein's test does not give false positives.
