= Climber's finger =

Medical condition

Climber's finger is one of the most common climbing injuries within the sport of rock climbing, accounting for about 30% of finger injuries seen in climbers. It is an overuse injury that usually manifests in a swollen middle or ring finger due to a damaged flexor tendon pulley, normally the A2 or A4 pulley. It is particularly common after a repeated utilization of small holds. Continued climbing on an injured finger may result in increased downtime in order to recover. The injury was first described in 1988 by Dr. S.R. Bollen.

== Cause ==
Rock climbers often support their body with bent fingers on small edges, known as "crimps", especially on more difficult routes. This can cause a characteristic injury to the pulleys (annular ligaments), named "climber's finger".

== Treatment ==
Management of pulley injuries of the fingers is to follow the RICE method. Other treatment suggestions are listed below:

- The patient is to immediately cease climbing and any other activity that puts stress on the injured finger, and consult a doctor if there is noticeable "bowstringing" on the flexor tendon or if unsure about the nature of the injury.
- There are different theories out there for the preferred line of approach. Some argue for the use of NSAIDs and ice for visible swelling only.
- Light massage can be used to increase blood flow to the injured area, aiding recovery. Massage tools such as acupressure rings can be beneficial in the same way.
- Protein supplements may help the tendons recover faster by providing much needed building block nutrients.
- When the pain and swelling is gone (depending on the grade of the injury, 1–4 weeks), the patient can begin with an active healing process – containing squeezing putty clay or a stress ball. This can be combined with mild exercise, such as finger flexions, to ensure the finger will heal properly and better prepared for future stress. The use of heating pads and cold water baths are also mentioned in several sources in order to increase blood flow.
- The patient can gradually return to climbing while using prophylactic taping when climbing. There is some research supporting the use of taping, especially concerning bowstringing, but more research is needed. It is advised to spend the first weeks climbing relatively easy routes with big holds, good footholds and keeping sessions short. Stay away from overhangs and campus areas/boards.
- The patient can return to full-force climbing if easy climbing yields no pain. Continue taping (it will also serve as a mental note of the previous injury) and avoid tweaky crimps and pockets for several months, since complete tendon healing can take 100 days or more.
