= Peritenon =

Anatomical feature of the Achilles tendon

Peritenon (from peri-: around, tenon: tendon) is the connective tissue sheath surrounding a tendon. Inflammation of a peritenon is called "peritendinitis" or "peritenonitis". Although Achilles tendon has no synovial sheath, it has a peritenon instead which has the same function.

== Structure ==
It consists of 3 layers: parietal, visceral and mesotenon in between.

== Function ==
Peritenon provides vascular supply for Achilles tendon along with vessels from musculotendinous junction proximally, the periosteum distally. There is a relatively avascular zone located 2–6 cm proximal to its insertion that is named "watershed area of the tendo Achilles". The watershed area's blood supply is mainly from the peritenon, specifically vessels in the mesotenon anteriorly.
