= Intersection syndrome =

Inflammation of intersecting muscles of the forearm

- Other names: Historically described as: oarsman wrist, crossover syndrome, peritendinitis crepitans, adventitial bursitis, subcutaneous perimyositis, APL syndrome, Bugaboo forearm
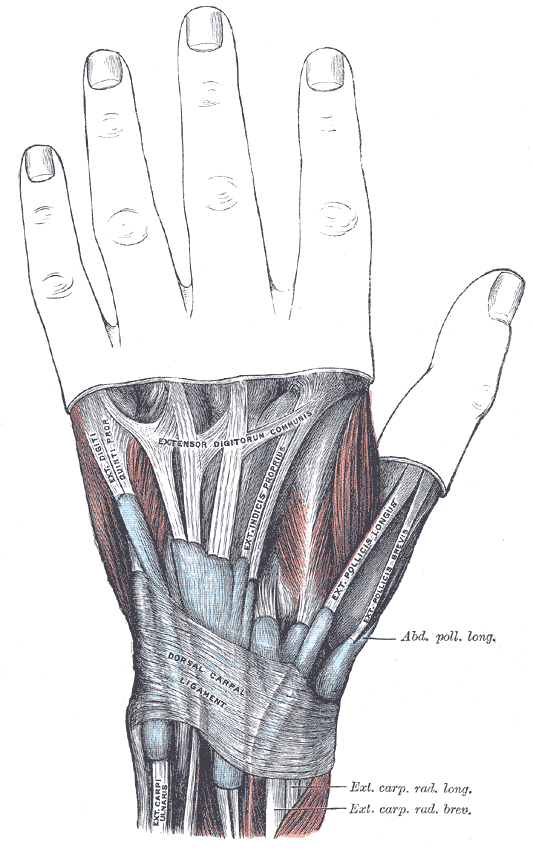
- The muscles of the first extensor compartment are labeled on the far right side of the thumb (abductor pollicis longus and extensor pollicis brevis). The muscles in the second extensor compartment are labeled with arrows at the bottom of the image (extensor carpi radialis longus and extensor carpi radialis brevis). Intersection syndrome occurs at the crossing point of these two compartments.
- Specialty: Orthopedic surgery, Hand surgery, Plastic surgery
- Symptoms: Pain, tenderness, and swelling along the thumb side of the distal forearm
- Usual onset: Gradual
- Risk factors: Repetitive friction of the wrist extensor compartments against one another
- Diagnostic method: Clinical diagnosis based on history, clinical symptoms, and physical exam
- Differential diagnosis: De Quervain syndrome, thumb carpometacarpal joint osteoarthritis, muscle strain, Wartenberg's syndrome
- Treatment: Conservative management (rest, anti-inflammatory medications, splinting) is the first line treatment If no improvement with conservative management, consider corticosteroid injections and surgery

Intersection syndrome is a painful inflammatory condition affecting the thumb-side of the wrist and forearm on the back of the arm. The wrist and forearm contain several compartments of extensor muscles that help move the wrist, hand, and fingers. Intersection syndrome occurs where the compartment containing the muscles that help move the thumb crosses over the compartment containing the muscles that help extend the wrist.

The first dorsal extensor compartment contains the abductor pollicis longus and extensor pollicis brevis muscles and their tendons, which contribute to thumb motion. The second extensor compartment contains the extensor carpi radialis longus and the extensor carpi radialis brevis muscle bellies and tendons, which contribute to wrist extension. Intersection syndrome involves these two compartments and is a type of tenosynovitis that develops gradually. The mechanism of injury is usually repetitive resisted extension, as with rowing, weight lifting, or pulling.

Diagnosis of intersection syndrome is clinical, based on patient symptoms. Imaging is not required for a diagnosis, but ultrasound and MRI can be used to confirm the diagnosis if the presentation is unclear.

Intersection syndrome is often confused with another condition called DeQuervain's syndrome, which is a similar inflammatory condition of the first dorsal extensor compartment of the wrist. Pain is often felt in a similar area, but closer to the thumb.

== Signs and symptoms ==
Symptoms of intersection syndrome include pain, tenderness, and edema on the thumb-side of the dorsal forearm and wrist. These findings are reported to be most severe about 4 to 8 cm proximal to the radial styloid. Pain is observed with movement of the wrist, primarily in extension and with ulnar deviation. Notably, this discomfort is more proximal on the wrist than seen in De Quervain syndrome. In severe cases, crepitus may be heard or palpated in this region.

Provocative tests, such as resisted wrist extension, thumb extension, or ulnar deviation can be used to elicit symptoms in the area.

== Epidemiology ==
Intersection syndrome is a rare condition overall, with less than 1 case per 100,000 patients annually. Incidence and injury patterns are equal between males and females.

== Anatomy ==
The dorsal side of the wrist contains six compartments containing extensor tendons:

1. Abductor pollicis longus (APL) and extensor pollicis brevis (EPB)
2. Extensor carpi radialis longus (EPRL) and extensor carpi radialis brevis (EPRB)
3. Extensor pollicis longus (EPL)
4. Extensor digitorum communis (EDC) and extensor indicis proprius (EIP)
5. Extensor digiti minimi (EDM)
6. Extensor carpi ulnaris (ECU)

While intersection syndrome primarily involves the second compartment (ECRL and ECRB), many of the symptoms come from irritation along the first compartment as well. Notably, the fourth dorsal extensor compartment also contains the posterior interosseous nerve (PIN) which supplies nearly all of the wrist extensor muscles.

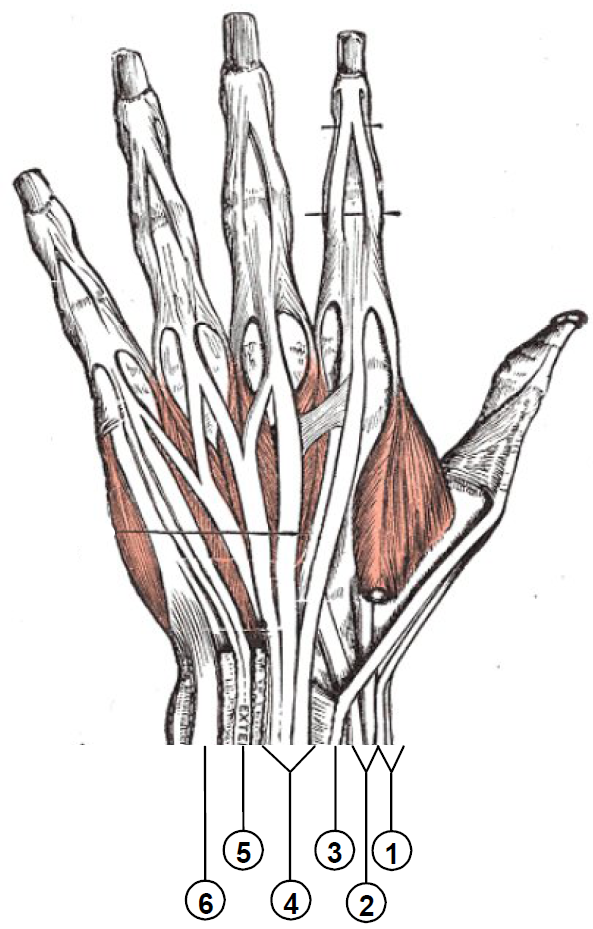
Extensor compartments of the wrist labeled.

Each of these compartments has an associated pathology or syndrome:

1. De Quervain syndrome
2. Intersection syndrome
3. Drummer's wrist
4. Extensor tenosynovitis
5. Vaughan-Jackson syndrome
6. Snapping ECU

== Pathophysiology ==
The pathophysiology of intersection syndrome is unclear with two main prevailing theories. Early data suggests the etiology of symptoms arising from friction between the first two extensor compartments. The muscle bellies of the first dorsal extensor compartment, abductor pollicis longus and extensor pollicis brevis, intersect at a 60° angle with the muscle bellies of the second dorsal extensor compartment, extensor carpi radialis longus and extensor carpi radialis brevis. Repetitive friction at this site, especially from wrist extension and pronation, aggravates the tendon sheaths.

In the mid 1980s, a landmark study by Grundberg et al., 1985 suggested that the etiology of intersection syndrome came primarily from stenosis of the second dorsal extensor compartment, also known as stenosing tenosynovitis. This narrowed compartment develops an accumulation of reactive tissue beneath the APL and EPB.

Etiology

The mechanism of this condition is repetitive wrist extension. This motion creates friction between the two extensor compartments and over time leads to tenosynovitis, or inflammation of the tendon sheath. Activities that require repetitive wrist extension and radial deviation such as rowing, canoeing, skiing, racquet sports, horseback riding, and weight lifting may be precipitating factors.

== Diagnosis ==
Intersection syndrome is diagnosed clinically based on patient symptoms, history, and physical exam. Clinical symptoms include pain, tenderness, edema, or crepitus on the dorsoradial wrist about 4 to 8 cm proximal to the radial styloid. History may include repetitive wrist extension during activities, including but not limited to rowing, weight lifting, canoeing, skiing, and more. On physical exam, pain and weakness during resisted wrist extension, thumb extension, or ulnar deviation of the wrist may be observed. This collective presentation would lead to a diagnosis of intersection syndrome.

The location on the dorsoradial wrist where the tenderness is felt can differentiate intersection syndrome from the similar condition of De Quervain syndrome. De Quervain tenosynovitis will present with maximum tenderness along the tendon sheath between the radial styloid into the interphalangeal joints of the thumb. In contrast, intersection syndrome will have maximum tenderness about 4 to 8 cm proximal to the radial styloid. A method for differentiating intersection syndrome from De Quervain syndrome is through local anesthetic injections into the specific extensor sheaths and monitoring for symptomatic relief.

Ultrasound and MRI can be used to confirm diagnosis when the clinical findings are unclear. Ultrasound imaging is considered first-line and provides valuable anatomical information regarding the extent of intersection syndrome. Ultrasound will reveal tenosynovitis and peritendinous edema.

Differential diagnoses

Differential diagnoses include:

1. De Quervain syndrome/De Quervain's tenosynovitis
2. Thumb carpometacarpal joint osteoarthritis
3. Wartenberg's syndrome

== Treatment ==
Treatment of intersection syndrome is similar to many other overuse injuries of the hand. Initial treatment involves rest, activity modification, oral non-steroidal anti-inflammatory drugs (NSAIDs), elevation, and compression. Modifying activities aims to reduce wrist motion and thus, friction at the junction between the first and second dorsal extensor compartments. Immobilization of the wrist in a neutral position in a brace or splint is helpful to rest the wrist and should be maintained for 2-3 weeks. Nearly 60% of patients with intersection syndrome report to heal with conservative treatment alone.

Rehabilitation should follow after conservative measures, with progressive stretching and mobilization of the wrist and surrounding joints. Later on, gradual strength training should be incorporated.

Second-line treatments

For patients with symptoms persisting beyond two to three weeks with immobilization, a second-line intervention should be initiated. Corticosteroid injections can provide pain relief and reduce inflammation of the tender area. This can be done with an injection of 1% lidocaine with betamethasone.

In refractory cases or in patients who do not desire conservative treatment, surgical intervention with decompression of the second dorsal compartment may be considered. This surgery has demonstrated promising results in symptom elimination 10 months after completion. Other surgical treatments involve tenosynovectomy and fasciotomy of the first dorsal compartment (APL and EPB).

== History ==
Intersection syndrome was first described in 1841 by a French surgeon named Alfred-Armand-Louis-Marie Velpeau. This condition went by many names back then, including oarsman wrist, crossover syndrome, peritendinitis crepitans, adventitial bursitis, subcutaneous perimyositis, APL syndrome, and bugaboo forearm. The official term, intersection syndrome, was named in 1978 by James Harold Dobyns from the Mayo Clinic.
