= Osteoarthritis at the base of the thumb =

- Other names: Carpometacarpal (CMC) osteoarthritis (OA) of the thumb, basilar (or basal) joint arthritis, rhizarthrosis; trapeziometacarpal osteoarthritis (TMC OA)
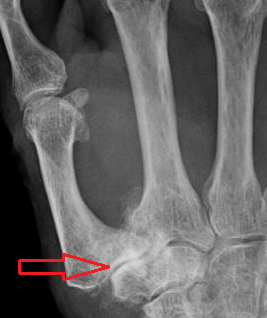
- Osteoarthritis of the trapeziometacarpal joint
- Specialty: Plastic surgery

Osteoarthritis at the base of the thumb, also known as trapeziometacarpal arthritis (TMC OA) or thumb carpometacarpal osteoarthritis (TMC OA). The main symptom is pain, particularly with gripping and pinching. This pain is often described as weakness, but true weakness is not a part of this disease. People may also note a change in shape of the thumb.

The joint is formed by the trapezium bone of the wrist and the metacarpal bone of the thumb. This is one of the joints in the human body where most of us develop osteoarthritis with age. Osteoarthritis is age-related loss of the smooth surface of the bone where it moves against another bone (cartilage of the joint). In reaction to the loss of cartilage, the bones thicken at the joint surface, resulting in subchondral sclerosis. Also, bony outgrowths, called osteophytes (also known as "bone spurs"), are formed at the joint margins.

Surgery is available, but most people seem to accommodate trapeziometacarpal arthritis.

== Signs and symptoms ==
The symptom that brings people with TMC OA to the doctor is pain. Pain is typically experienced with gripping and pinching. People experiencing pain may describe it as weakness.

There may be enlargement at the TMC joint. This area may be tender, meaning it is painful when pressed. There may also be hyperextension of the metacarpophalangeal joint. The thumb metacarpal deviates towards the middle of the hand (adduction). Also a grinding sound, known as crepitus, can be heard when the TMC joint is moved, more so when axial pressure is applied.

== Cause ==
TMC OA is an expected part of aging in men and women equally. A population-based study of radiographic signs of pathophysiology in 3,595 people assessed in a research-related comprehensive health examination found no association with physical workload. A study of people seeing a hand specialist for symptoms unrelated to TMC OA demonstrated no relationship of radiographic TMC OA to hand activity.

Studies that compare people presenting with TMC symptoms to people without symptoms are sometimes interpreted as indicating that activities can contribute to the development of TMC OA. A more accurate conclusion may be that hand use is associated with seeking care for symptoms related to TMC OA. Ligamentous laxity is often associated with TMC OA, but this is based on rationale rather than experimental evidence. Obesity may be related to TMC OA.

== Pathophysiology ==
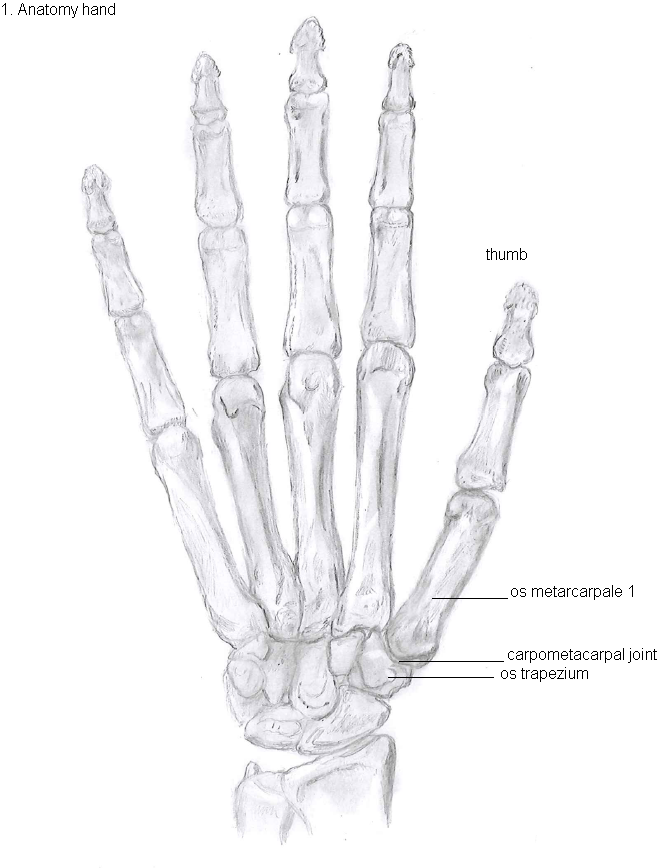
Bones of the hand

The TMC joint is a synovial joint between the trapezium bone of the wrist and the metacarpal bone at the base of the thumb. This joint is a so-called saddle joint (articulatio sellaris), unlike the CMC joints of the other four fingers which are ellipsoid joints. This means that the surfaces of the TMC joint are both concave and convex.

This shape provides the TMC joint a wide range of motion. Movements include:

- Flexion
- Extension
- Abduction
- Adduction
- Opposition
- Reposition
- Circumduction

The TMC joint is stabilized by 16 ligaments. Of these ligaments, the deep anterior oblique ligament, also known as the palmar beak ligament, is considered to be the most important stabilizing ligament.

== Diagnosis ==
Diagnosed based on symptoms. Xrays can confirm the diagnosis and the severity. Other diagnoses in this region include scaphotrapezial trapezoid arthritis and first dorsal compartment tendinopathy (De Quervain syndrome) although these are usually easy to distinguish.

=== Classification ===
TMC OA severity was classified by Eaton and Littler which can be simplified as follows:

Stage 1:

- slight widening of the joint space
- < 1/3 subluxation of the joint (in any projection)

Stage 2:

- Osteophytes, < 2 mm in diameter, are present. (usually adjacent to the volar or dorsal facets of the trapezium)

Stage 3:

- Osteophytes, > 2 mm in diameter, are present (usually adjacent to the volar and dorsal facets of the trapezium)
- Slight joint space narrowing

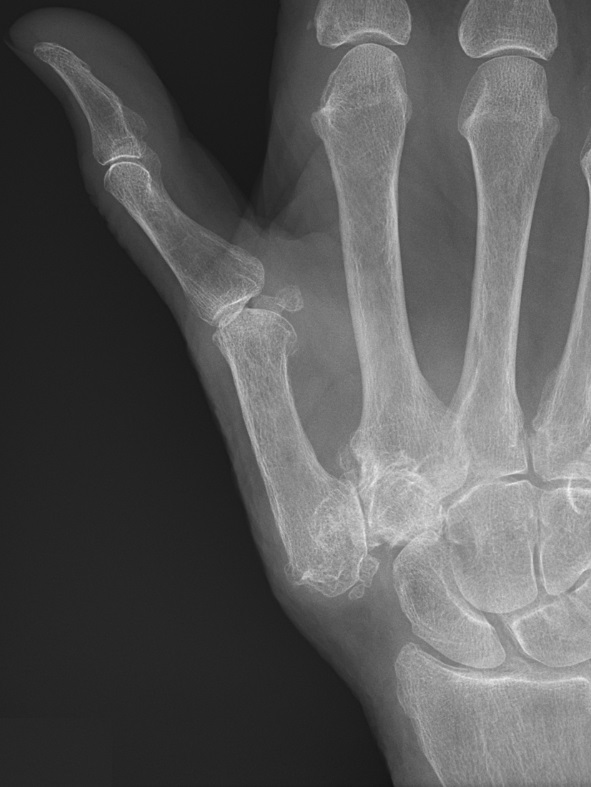
Stage 4 trapeziometacarpal osteoarthritis, with major subluxation of the joint

Stage 4:

- Narrow joint space
- Concomitant scaphotrapezial arthritis

A simpler classification is no arthritis, some arthritis, and severe arthritis. This simpler classification system omits the potentially contradictory details of the Eaton/Littler classification and keeps scaphotrapezial arthrosis separate.

== Treatment ==
There are no treatments proved to slow or relieve TMC OA. In other words, there are no disease-modifying treatments. All treatments are symptom alleviating (palliative). Most surgery is reconstructive—it removes the TMC joint. Metacarpal osteotomy was proposed as a potentially disease modifying surgery for more limited arthrosis, but there is no experimental support for this theory.

There is limited and limited quality evidence regarding splints, corticosteroid injections, manual therapy and other palliative measures. Studies with adequate randomization, blinding, and independent assessment are lacking.

Arthrodesis fuses the TMC joint. It is uncommonly used. Arthroplasty surgery for TMC OA removes part or all of the trapezium. Surgery may also support the metacarpal by reconstructing a ligament using a tendon graft or weave. Surgery may also place something in the space where the trapeziometacarpal joint was, either a tendon wrapped up into a ball or a prosthesis.

The best available evidence suggests no difference in symptom alleviation with these variations of TMC arthroplasty.

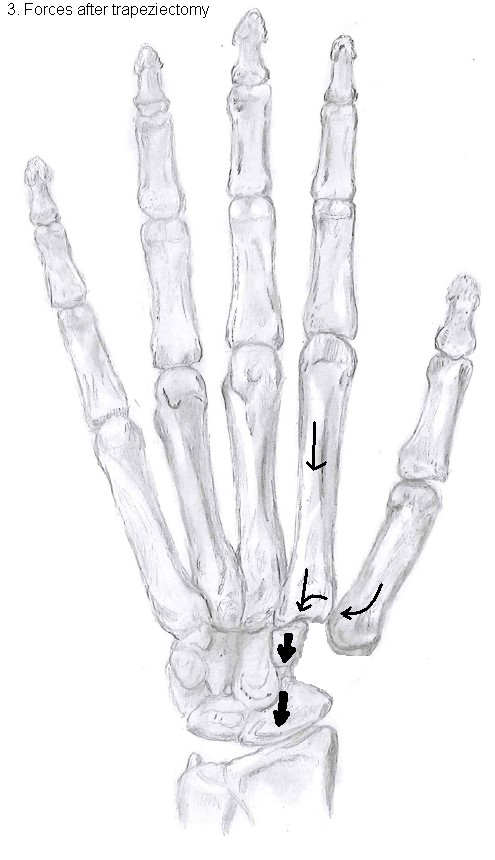
Showing the forces after trapeziectomy

In one randomized trial comparing trapeziectomy alone with trapeziectomy with ligament reconstruction and trapeziectomy with ligament reconstruction and tendon interposition, patients evaluated 5 to 18 years after surgery had similar pain intensity, grip strength and key and tip pinch strengths after each procedure. Trapeziectomy alone is associated with fewer complications than the other procedures.

=== Trapeziectomy ===
During trapeziectomy, the trapezium bone is removed without any further surgical adjustments. The trapezium bone is removed through an approximately three centimeter long incision along the lateral side of the thumb. To preserve surrounding structures, the trapezium bone is removed "by splitting" it into pieces.

An empty gap is left by the trapeziectomy and the wound is closed with sutures. Despite this gap, no significant changes in function of the thumb are reported. After the surgery, the thumb will be immobilized with a cast.

==== With tendon interposition ====
Some physicians still believe that it is better to fill the gap left by the trapeziectomy. They assume that filling the gap with a part of a tendon is preferable in terms of function, stability and position of the thumb. This is based on the assumption that interposition can help maintain the space between the metacarpal and the scaphoid, which will improve comfort and capability. Neither of these assumptions is supported by experimental evidence.

During trapeziectomy with TI, a longitudinal strip of the palmaris longus tendon is collected. If this tendon is absent (which is the case in 13% of the population), half of the flexor carpi radialis tendon (FCR) can be used.

The tendon is then formed into a circular shape and placed in the gap, where it is stabilized by sutures.

==== With ligament reconstruction ====
Another technique is used to reconstruct the volar beak ligament after trapeziectomy. The rationale is that ligament reconstruction(LR) helps maintain the gap between the metacarpal and the scaphoid, and that a larger gap is associated with greater comfort and capability. Again these possibilities are not supported by experimental evidence.

During this procedure the anterior oblique ligament is reconstructed using the FCR tendon. There is a wide variety in techniques to perform this LR, but they all have a similar goal.

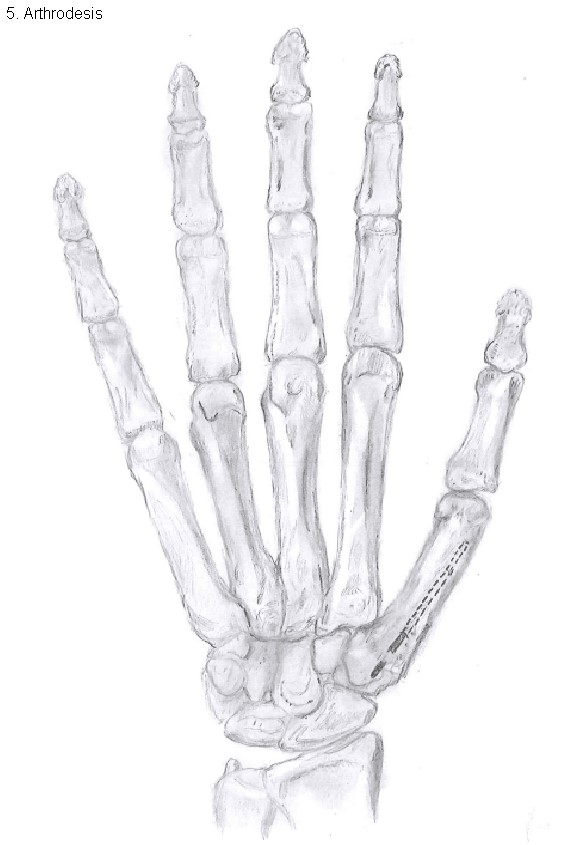
Arthrodesis of the thumb

==== With LRTI ====
Some physicians believe that combining LR with TI will help maintain gap between the metacarpal and the scaphoid. And that doing so will improve comfort and capability. Keep in mind that these aspects of the rationale are not supported by experimental evidence. The evidence suggests that all of these procedures have comparable long-term results.

=== Arthrodesis ===
Arthrodesis of the TMC joint is a surgical procedure in which the trapezium bone and the metacarpal bone of the thumb are secured together. They are held together by K-wires or a plate and screws until the bone will heal.

Disadvantages include inability to flatten the hand. Additionally, the stress on the CMC joint is now spread over the adjacent joints, those joints are more likely to develop osteoarthritis.

Nevertheless, this procedure can be used in patients with stage II and III CMC OA as well as in young people with posttraumatic osteoarthritis.

=== Joint replacement ===
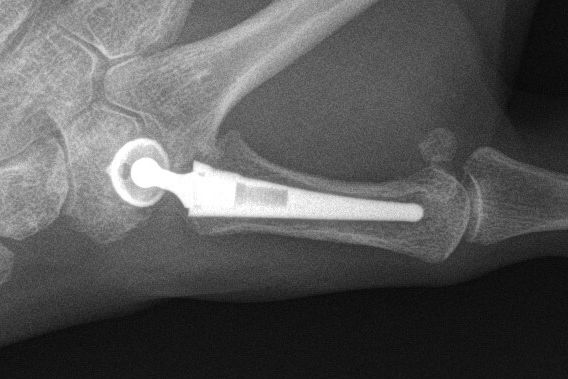
X-ray of trapeziometacarpal joint replacement. Left hand of a 58-year-old woman.

The joint can be replaced with artificial material. An artificial joint is also referred to as a prosthesis. Prostheses are more problematic at the trapeziometacarpal joint compared to joints like the knee or the hips.

Prostheses come in many varieties, such as spacers or resurfacing prostheses.

It's not clear based on current evidence that a prosthesis has any advantage over trapeziectomy.

Overall, joint replacements are related to long-term complications such as subluxation, fracture, and synovitis (due to the material used). Some problems lead to a second surgery to either remove or repair the prosthesis. Also note that usage of a joint replacement is heavy in costs.

The quality of the prostheses is improving and some believe this will have a positive effect on outcome in the years to follow.

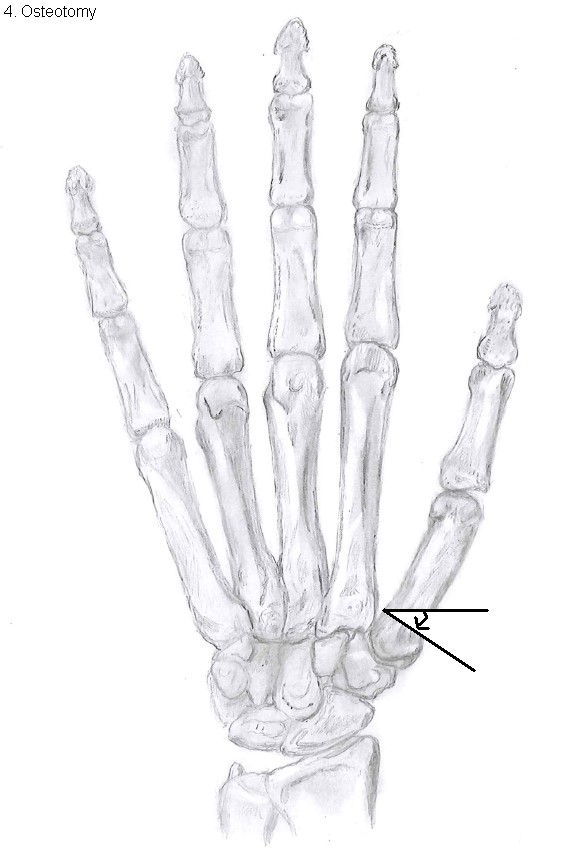
Osteotomy of the thumb

=== Metacarpal osteotomy ===
The aim of metacarpal osteotomy is to change the pressure distribution on the TMC joint. The hope is that this will slow the pace of development of osteoarthritis. There is no evidence that this procedure can modify the natural course of TMC OA. Osteotomy may be considered for people with mild arthritis.

During osteotomy, the metacarpal is cut and a wedge shape bone fragment is removed to move the bone away from the hand. Postoperative, the thumb of the patient is immobilized using a thumb-cast.

Possible complications are non-union of the bone, persistent pain related to unrecognized CMC or pantrapezial disease and radial sensory nerve injury.

=== Complications ===
The most common complication after surgery is pain persisting in the thumb. Over long term, there is pain relief, but on short term, patients experience pain from the surgery itself. The main complaint is a burning sensation or hypersensitivity over the incision. Some patients develop a complex regional pain syndrome. This is a syndrome of chronic pain with changes of temperature and colour of the skin.

Other general complications include superficial radial nerve damage and postoperative wound infection.

After arthrodesis, non-union, in which fusion of the trapezium bone with the metacarpal bone fails, occurs in 8% to 21% of the cases.

Subluxation of a prosthesis is a complication where the prosthesis is mobile and is partially dislocated. When the prosthesis is fully dislocated it is called a luxation. Both are painful and need revision surgery so the prosthesis can be repaired or removed. When using a prosthesis over a longer period of time, there is a chance of breaking the prosthesis itself. This is due to mechanical wear.

Prostheses might also cause a reaction of the body against the artificial material they are made of, resulting in local inflammation.

== Epidemiology ==
CMC OA is the most common form of OA affecting the hand. Dahaghin et al. showed that about 15% of women and 7% of men between 50 and 60 years of age develop CMC OA of the thumb. However, in about 65% of people older than 55 years, radiologic evidence of OA was present without any symptoms. Armstrong et al. reported a prevalence of 33% in postmenopausal women, of which one-third was symptomatic, compared to 11% in men older than 55 years. This shows CMC OA of the thumb is significantly more prevalent in women, especially in postmenopausal women, compared to men.
