= Common flexor sheath of hand =

Part of the human hand

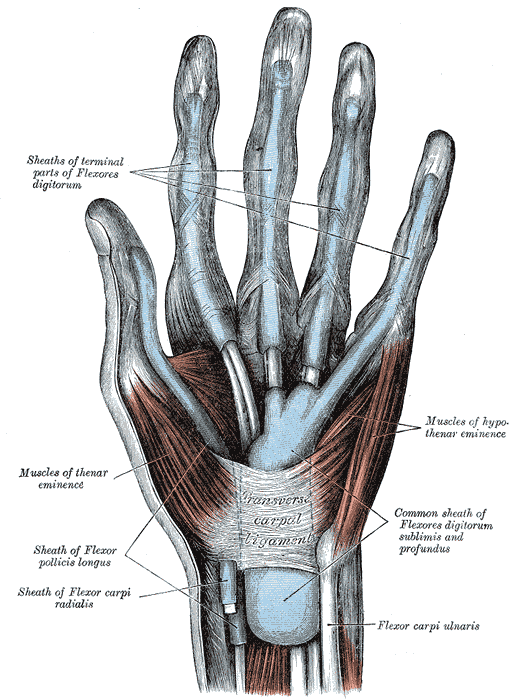
- The synovial sheaths of the tendons on the front of the wrist and fingers. (Common sheath of flexores digitorum subliminis and profundus labeled at center right.)

Details

Identifiers
- Latin: vagina communis tendinum musculorum flexorum manus, vagina communis musculorum flexorum
- TA98: A04.8.04.007
- TA2: 2575

The common flexor sheath of hand or the ulnar bursa is a synovial sheath in the carpal tunnel of the human hand.

It contains tendons of the flexor digitorum superficialis and the flexor digitorum profundus, but not the flexor pollicis longus.

The sheath which surrounds the flexor digitorum extends downward about halfway along the metacarpal bones, where it ends in blind diverticula around the tendons to the index, middle, and ring fingers. It is prolonged on the tendons to the little finger and usually communicates with the synovial sheath of these tendons.

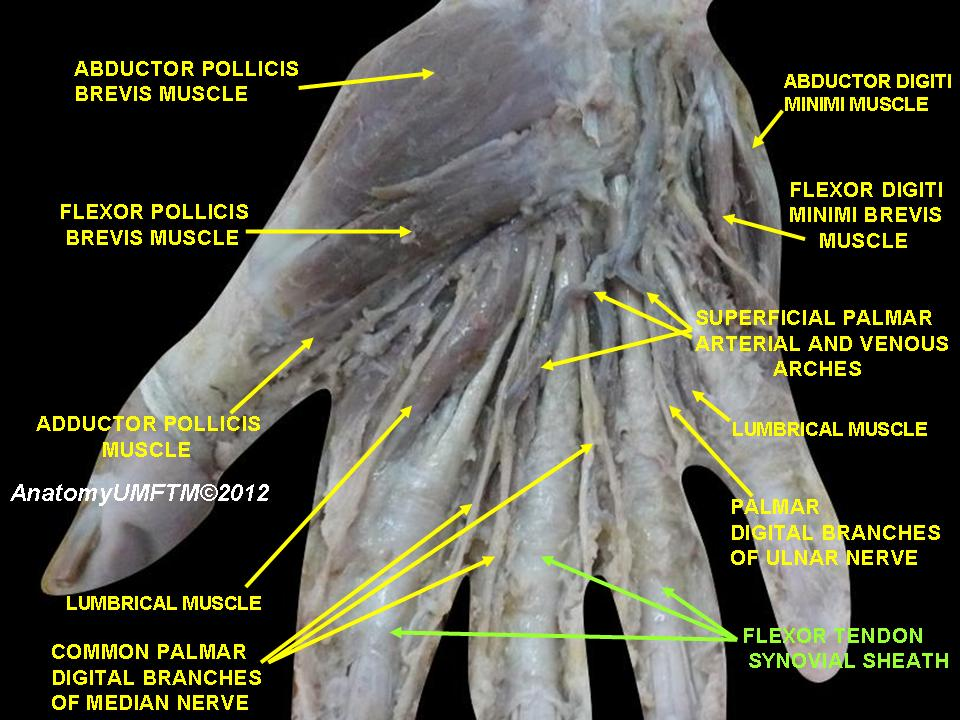
flexor tendon sinovial sheath of hand

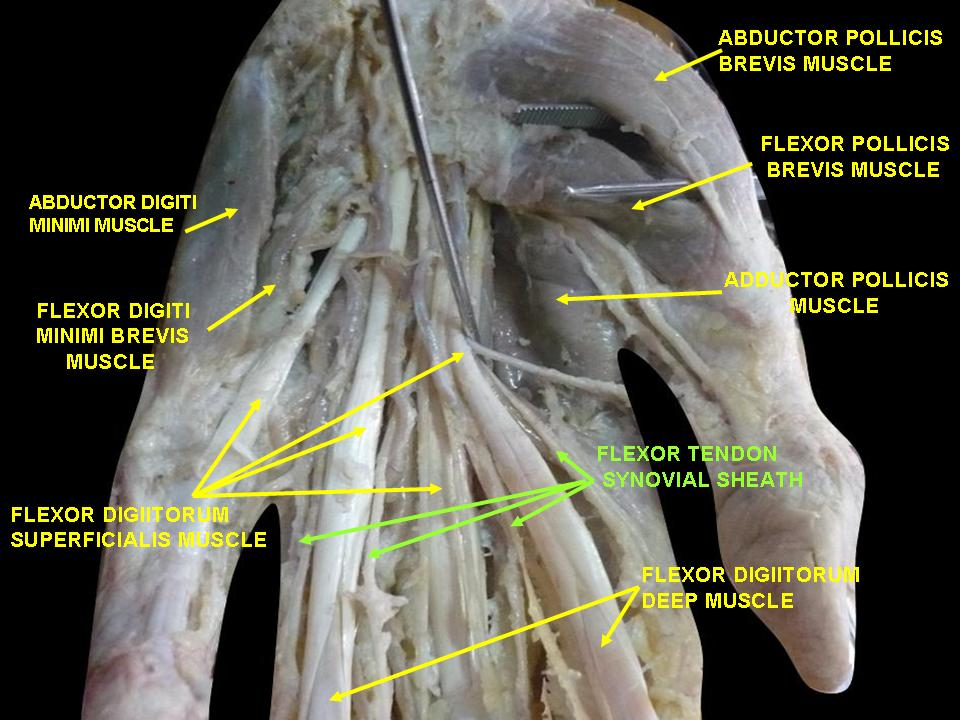
flexor tendon sinovial sheath of hand

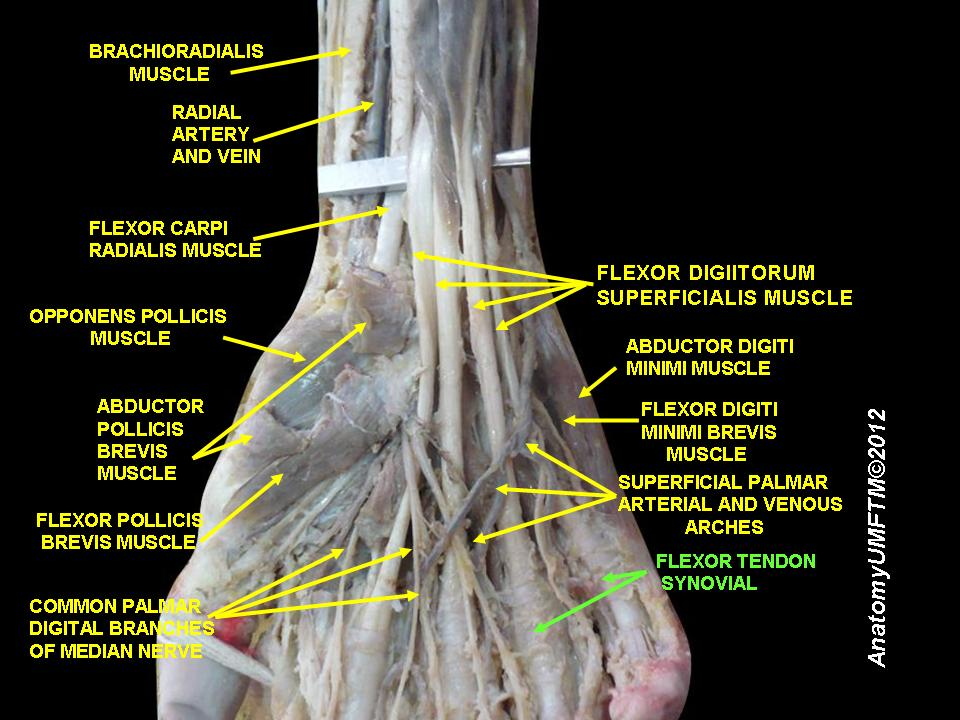
flexor tendon sinovial sheath of hand
