= Trigger finger =

Locking of a finger when at full flexion

- Other names: Trigger digit, trigger thumb, stenosing tenosynovitis
- An example of trigger finger affecting the ring finger
- Specialty: Hand surgery, orthopedic surgery, and plastic surgery
- Symptoms: Catching or locking of the involved finger, pain
- Usual onset: 50s to 60s years old
- Risk factors: Generally idiopathic, meaning no known cause. Perhaps diabetes
- Diagnostic method: Symptoms and signs
- Differential diagnosis: Sagittal band rupture
- Treatment: Steroid injections, surgery. The role of splint immobilization is uncertain
- Frequency: Relatively common

Trigger finger, also known as stenosing tenosynovitis, is a disorder characterized by catching or locking of the involved finger in full or near full flexion, typically when the hand is closed with force. There may be tenderness in the palm of the hand near the last skin crease (distal palmar crease). The ring finger and thumb are the most common digits.

The problem is generally idiopathic (no known cause). People with diabetes might be relatively prone to trigger finger. The pathophysiology is enlargement of the flexor tendon and the A1 pulley of the tendon sheath. While often referred to as a type of stenosing tenosynovitis (which implies inflammation) the pathology is mucoid degeneration. Mucoid degeneration refers to changes in fibrous tissue, such as tendon, to have less organized collagen, more abundant extracellular matrix, and changes in the cells (fibrocytes) so as to act and look more like cartilage cells (chondroid metaplasia). Diagnosis is typically based on symptoms and signs after excluding other possible causes.

Trigger digits can resolve without treatment. Treatment options that are disease modifying include steroid injections and surgery. Splinting immobilization of the finger may or may not be disease modifying.

== Signs and symptoms ==
Symptoms include catching or locking of the involved finger when it is forcefully flexed (tight fist). There may be tenderness in the palm of the hand near the last skin crease (distal palmar crease). Often a nodule can be felt in this area. There is some evidence that idiopathic trigger finger behaves differently in people with diabetes.

== Causes ==
The vast majority of trigger digits are idiopathic, meaning there is no known cause. A study of 95,437 people in a diabetes registry in Sweden found that among people with either Type 1 (9,692) or Type 2 (85,755) diabetes, a higher hemoglobin A1C level was modestly associated with diagnosis of trigger digit.

Some speculate that repetitive forceful use of a digit leads to narrowing of the fibrous digital sheath in which it runs, but there is little scientific data to support this theory. The relationship of trigger finger to work activities is debatable and there are arguments for and against a relationship to hand use with no experimental evidence supporting a relationship.

== Diagnosis ==
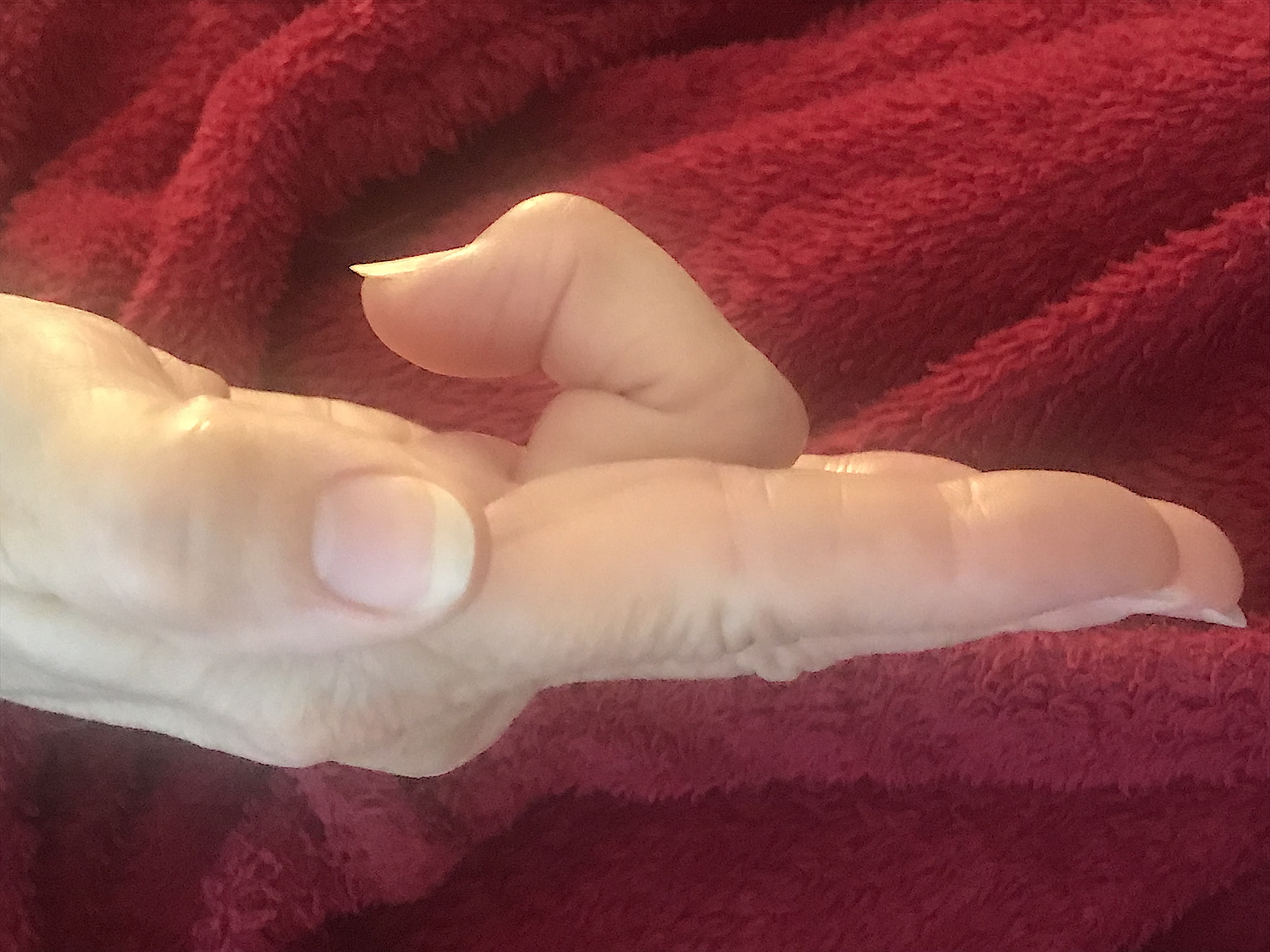
Side view of trigger finger in the right middle finger

Diagnosis is made on interview and physical examination. More than one finger may be affected at a time. Trigger Finger is most common in the thumb and ring finger. The triggering occurs when making a fist or while gripping an object firmly. Triggering can be more noticeable in the morning, presumably because the enlargement of the tendon is maximum when the finger is not being used. Upon waking, the affected person may have to force the triggered fingers open with their other hand. In some, this can be a daily occurrence.

== Treatment ==
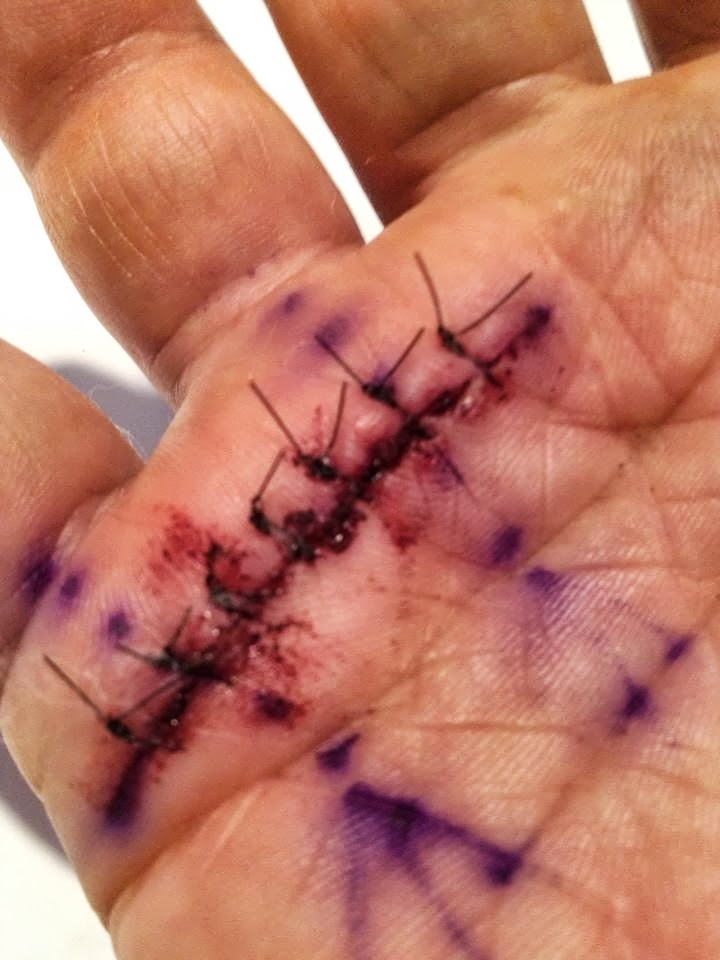
Post operative photo of trigger finger release surgery in a diabetic patient. See:

Depending on the number of affected digits and the clinical severity of the condition, corticosteroid injections can cure trigger digits.

The infiltration of the affected site is straightforward using standard anatomic landmarks. There is evidence that the steroid does not need to enter the sheath. The role of sonographic guidance is therefore debatable.

Injection of the tendon sheath with a corticosteroid resolved triggering after between 2 weeks and 3 months in more than half of people. Steroid injection may be slightly less effective in people with Type 1 diabetes. If triggering persists 3 months after injection, a second injection can be considered. Most specialists recommend no more than 3 injections because corticosteroids can weaken the tendon and there is a possibility of tendon rupture.

Triggering is predictably resolved by a relatively simple surgical procedure under local anesthesia. The surgeon will cut the sheath that is restricting the tendon. The patient should be awake in order to confirm adequate release. On occasion, triggering does not resolve until a slip of the FDS (flexor digitorum superficialis) tendon is resected.

One study suggests that the most cost-effective treatment is up to two corticosteroid injections followed by open release of the first annular pulley. Choosing surgery immediately is an option and can be affordable if done in the office under local anesthesia.

=== Surgery ===
Trigger digits can be released percutaneously using a needle. This is not used for the thumb where the digital nerves are at greater risk.

==== Postoperative outcome ====
In some trigger finger patients, tenderness is found in the dorsal proximal interphalangeal (PIP) joint. Dorsal PIP joint tenderness is more common in trigger fingers than previously thought. It is also associated with higher and prolonged levels of postoperative pain after A1 pulley release. Therefore, patients with pre-existing PIP tenderness should be informed about the possibility of sustaining residual minor pain for up to 3 months after surgery.
