= De Quervain tendinopathy =

Restricted movement of tendons controlling the thumb

de Quervain Syndrome
- Other names: Potentially misleading names related to speculative causes: BlackBerry thumb, texting thumb, gamer's thumb, washerwoman's sprain, mother's wrist, mommy thumb, designer's thumb. Variations on eponymic or anatomical names: radial styloid tenosynovitis, de Quervain disease, de Quervain tendinopathy, de Quervain tenosynovitis.
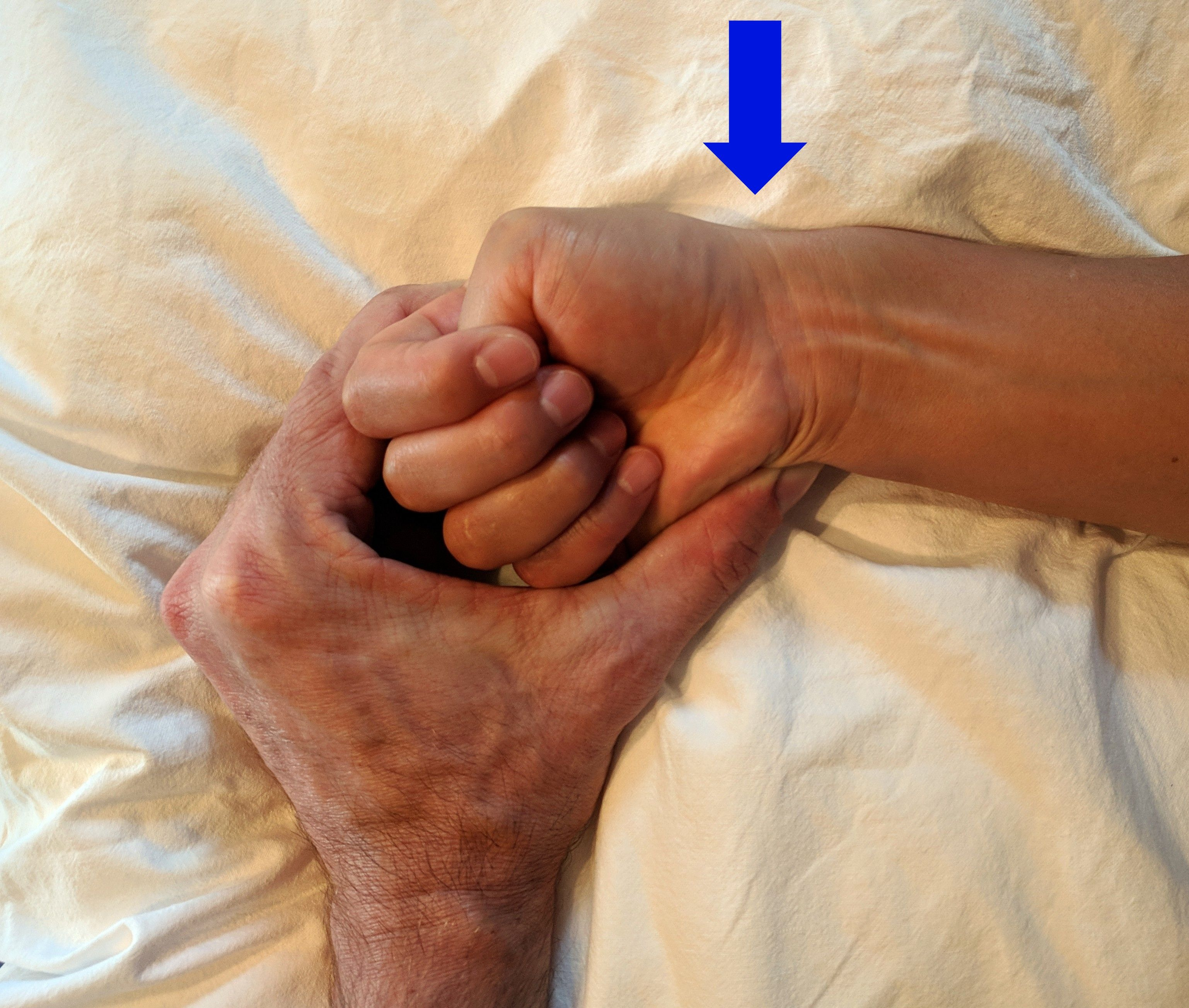
- The modified Eichoff maneuver, commonly referred to as the Finkelstein's test. The arrow mark indicates where the pain is worsened in de Quervain syndrome.
- Pronunciation: French pronunciation: [də kɛʁvɛ̃]
- Specialty: Hand surgery, Plastic surgery, Orthopedic surgery.
- Symptoms: Pain and tenderness on the thumb side of the wrist
- Usual onset: Gradual
- Risk factors: Repetitive movements, trauma
- Diagnostic method: Based on symptoms and examination
- Differential diagnosis: Base of thumb Osteoarthritis
- Treatment: Pain medications, splinting the wrist and thumb

De Quervain syndrome or De Quervain tendinopathy occurs when two tendons that control movement of the thumb become enlarged where they pass through their tendon sheath in the wrist. The characteristic symptoms are pain and tenderness on the thumb side of the wrist. Radial abduction of the thumb is painful. On some occasions, there is uneven movement or triggering of the thumb and wrist with radial abduction. The pathophysiology develops gradually. Symptoms can come on gradually or be noted suddenly.

The diagnosis is generally based on symptoms and physical examination. Diagnosis is supported if pain increases when the wrist is bent inwards while a person is grabbing their thumb within a fist.

The natural history of De Quervain tendinopathy (what happens without treatment) is a symptom resolution over about an approximate 1 year period. Symptom alleviation (palliative treatment) is provided mainly by splinting the thumb and wrist. Pain medications such as NSAIDs can also be considered. Steroid injections are commonly used, but are not proved to alter the natural history of the condition. Surgery to release the first dorsal component is an option.

== Signs and symptoms ==
Symptoms are radial-sided wrist pain, tenderness over the first dorsal compartment, fullness or thickening over the thumb side of the wrist, painful radial abduction of the thumb, and difficulty gripping with the affected side of the hand. Pain is made worse by movement of the thumb and wrist, and may radiate to the thumb or the forearm. The onset is often gradual, but sometimes the symptoms seem to come on suddenly and the problem is often misinterpreted as an injury.

== Causes ==
The cause of de Quervain tendinopathy is not established. Critics of an association with activity note the human mind's tendency to misinterpret activities that are painful as activities that make the problem worse. Caution is warranted given the potential for patients to feel worse and do less if they believe painful activity is harmful. Evidence regarding a possible relation with activity and occupation is debated. While individual studies sometimes identify associations between symptoms and work activities, a 2013 systematic review of collective evidence did not find any evidence of a causal relationship with activity or occupation. Proponents of the view that de Quervain syndrome is a repetitive strain injury, meaning damage due to frequent hand use, consider postures where the thumb is held in abduction and extension to be harmful to the tendon. According to this view, workers who perform rapid repetitive activities involving pinching, grasping, pulling or pushing can harm their tendons. These movements are associated with many types of repetitive housework such as chopping vegetables, stirring and scrubbing pots, vacuuming, cleaning surfaces, drying dishes, pegging out washing, mending clothes, gardening, harvesting, and weeding. Specific activities that have been postulated as potential risk factors include intensive computer mouse use, trackball use, and typing, as well as some pastimes, including bowling, golf, fly-fishing, piano-playing, sewing, and knitting.

The incidence of diagnosis of the condition is higher in women than in men. The syndrome commonly occurs during and, even more so, after pregnancy. Contributory factors may include hormonal changes, fluid retention and—again, more debatably—increased housework and lifting.

== Pathophysiology ==
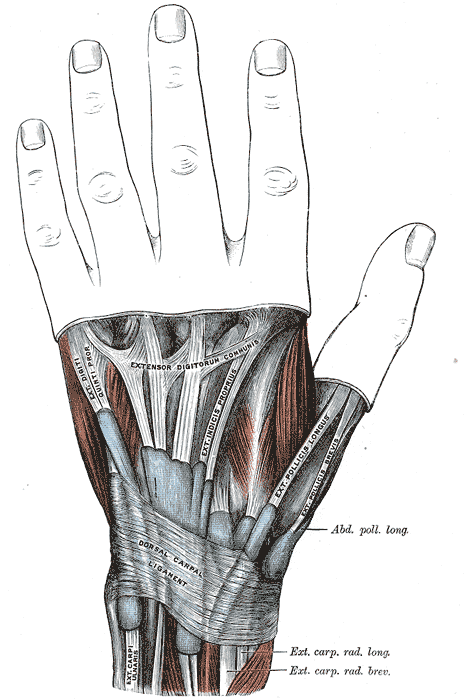
The extensor tendon sheaths on the back of the wrist.

De Quervain syndrome involves noninflammatory thickening of the tendons and the synovial sheaths that the tendons run through. The two tendons concerned are those of the extensor pollicis brevis and abductor pollicis longus muscles. These two muscles run side by side and function to bring the thumb away from the hand (radial abduction). De Quervain tendinopathy affects the tendons of these muscles as they pass from the forearm into the hand via a fibro-osseous tunnel (the first dorsal compartment). Evaluation of histopathological specimens shows a thickening and myxoid degeneration rather than inflammation or injury. The pathology is also mucoid degeneration in de Quervain syndrome in new mothers.

== Diagnosis ==
De Quervain syndrome is diagnosed based on patient history and physical examination. The modified Eichoff maneuver, commonly referred to as the Finkelstein test, is a physical exam maneuver used to diagnose de Quervain syndrome. To perform the test, the examiner grasps and ulnar deviates the hand when the person has their thumb held within their fist. If sharp pain occurs along the distal radius (top of the forearm, about an inch below the wrist), de Quervain syndrome is likely. While a positive Finkelstein test is often considered pathognomonic for de Quervain syndrome, the maneuver can also cause some pain in those with osteoarthritis at the base of the thumb.

=== Differential diagnosis ===
Differential diagnoses include:

1. Osteoarthritis of the trapezio-metacarpal joint
2. Intersection syndrome: Pain will be more towards the middle of the back of the forearm and about 2–3 inches below the wrist, usually with associated crepitus.
3. Wartenberg's syndrome: The primary symptom is paresthesia (numbness/tingling).

== Treatment ==
Many tendinoses and most enthesopathies are self-limiting. There is some evidence that de Quervain syndrome is self-limiting, although further study is needed.

The mainstay of symptom alleviation (palliative treatment) is a splint that immobilizes the wrist and the thumb to the interphalangeal joint. Activities are more comfortable with such a splint in place. Anti-inflammatory medication or acetaminophen may also alleviate symptoms.

Hand therapy is proposed as helpful for people with De Quervain’s syndrome. The exercises are gentle and they slowly strengthen the thumb and wrist muscles while improving mobility. This helps reduce pain and stiffness which makes it easier to use the hand for everyday tasks.

As with many musculoskeletal conditions, the management of de Quervain disease is determined more by convention than scientific data. A 2013 review found that corticosteroid injection seems to be an effective form of conservative management of de Quervain syndrome in approximately 50% of patients, although they have not been well-tested against placebo injection. Consequently, it remains uncertain whether injections are palliative and whether they can alter the natural history of the illness. Lack of relief after corticosteroid injection was linked to the presence of subcompartments of the extensor pollicis brevis tendon.

Surgery (in which the sheath of the first dorsal compartment is opened longitudinally) may provide relief in some people. The most important risk is to the radial sensory nerve. A small incision is made and the dorsal extensor retinaculum is identified. Once it has been identified, the release is performed longitudinally along the tendon. This is done to prevent potential subluxation of the first compartment tendons. Next, the abductor pollicis longus and extensor pollicis brevis are identified, and the compartments are released.

== History ==
From the original description of the illness in 1895 until the first description of corticosteroid injection by Jarrod Ismond in 1955, it appears that the only treatment offered was surgery. Since approximately 1972, the prevailing opinion has been that of McKenzie (1972) who suggested that corticosteroid injection should be the first line of treatment and that surgery should be reserved for unsuccessful injections.

=== Eponym ===
It is named after the Swiss surgeon Fritz de Quervain, who first identified it in 1895.
