= Active sitting =

Movement of the body while seated

Active sitting is the practice of enabling or encouraging movement while seated. It is also commonly known as dynamic sitting. The underlying notion highlights the advantages of incorporating flexibility and movement while sitting, as proponents suggest it can positively impact the human body while allowing the completion of certain tasks that require sitting. One of the earliest forms of active sitting is the common rocking chair which allows forward and backward swaying motion.

The concept of active sitting is gaining recognition, particularly among people whose work involves prolonged sitting. In the field of pediatric and adult rehabilitation, active sitting is of growing interest to individuals who use wheelchairs and adaptive seating, such as children and adults with cerebral palsy and spinal cord injury.

== Active sitting versus static sitting ==
Active or dynamic sitting is the opposite of static sitting. Static sitting occurs when seating is rigid, and results in sustained mechanical tissue loading. The bodily strain occurring with traditional rigid seating is widely thought to contribute to negative health effects. The human body is not well adapted for long hours spent sitting in a restrictive or constrained posture. In static sitting, the abdominal muscles may instinctively relax and even atrophy over prolonged periods of lessened physical activity. Furthermore, the prolonged postural loading of the spine while sitting, without natural movement and mobilization of the spinal joints, can reduce joint lubrication and increase stiffness, which can be detrimental to back health. Circulation, particularly of the legs, can be adversely affected as well. In fact, back pain and circulation discomfort are part of a growing avalanche of complaints which can be attributed in part to extensive static sitting. Additionally, sustained postures at a computer can place the upper back and neck muscles into positions of strain that, when combined with stress factors, contribute to muscle tension and resulting pain. The field of ergonomics recognizes that only in recent history is a large proportion of the human population sitting for long periods with little movement. The rising number of office jobs, as well as driving, contributes to the increased amount of static sitting that occurs.

Furthermore, many wheelchair users are positioned in wheelchairs or other adaptive seating devices that result in a static body posture. Because of the reduced postural stability of these individuals, prolonged sitting may cause them to adopt a flexed spinal posture and posteriorly tilted pelvis. Because these individuals may be unable to physically reposition without considerable assistance, their bodies can be subject to considerable positional strain and immobility, with detrimental physical repercussions. Adverse health effects include the formation of pressure ulcers, low back pain, and lumbar immobility and joint stiffness.

Children and adults in wheelchairs or seating devices that are rigid and/or semi-reclined can require significant physical effort to change their body posture on their own. Additionally, positioning accessories may be restrictive in an effort to counteract low tone, to restrain involuntary spastic movement, or to optimize body symmetry. Such positioning effectively prevents development of active postural movement control. Since the spinal motion of these individuals is constrained between their secured pelvis and the backrest of the wheelchair or chair, their potential to acquire an improved ability for active postural repositioning is negligible. Their movement can be limited to that of the upper extremities only. Thus, for wheelchair users, this static body posture may not only lead to physical strain, discomfort, and health issues, but can also interfere with performance of functional movement tasks.

The majority of chairs, stools, wheelchairs, and adaptive seating commercially available today still tends to be static, that is, they limit or restrict active postural movement. However, new options for seating are emerging. These innovative products are at the forefront of a new wave of office furniture and adaptive seating device options. These products typically allow some freedom of movement that encourages the human occupant to assume a more dynamic posture. These products may allow the seat and/or backrest to tilt in such a way that it follows and conforms to the movements and physical shape of the seated occupant. In this way, the seating enables dynamic sitting, which enhances functional movement and prevents the physical discomfort and potential bodily damage due to prolonged static sitting.

== Ergonomics ==
The field of ergonomics, in particular that of office furniture, now offers various active sitting products that enable different kinds of movement: forward and backward, lateral (side to side), 360 degree wobble, etc. The ergonomic research also indicates that, although movement is necessary, it is not enough. All movements are not the same; there are movements to be avoided. For example, movement that alternates between different awkward sitting postures that repeatedly load the same joints will provide little benefit. The benefits of active sitting are understood to occur with movements through a graded range of centered and symmetrical postures. The active and controlled postural positions in sitting are believed to activate and strengthen muscles in the back and core area, to relieve the static loads acting on joints, ligaments, and tendons, and to promote circulation for elimination of waste products. Thus, a dynamic, ergonomic sitting position is believed to lead to improved posture, core stability, and circulation.

Although extensive research in the field of ergonomics and active sitting is yet to become widely available, the logical benefits are easily extrapolated. The pelvis is tilted more forward in active sitting, and this pelvic position situates the spine for proper alignment and postural health. Since the individual is able to move in a controlled manner during active sitting, the body will strengthen postural muscles to maintain balance. This conditioning of the core muscles of the spine and trunk may significantly aid in preventing back pain. In turn, it is understood that movement lubricates and nourishes the spinal joints and intervertebral discs, keeping skeletal joints flexible and healthy. Many age-related changes in spinal joints are likely due to a lack of proper nourishment and motion. With postural stabilization in sitting and reaching, the leg and calf muscles are activated. When the muscles of the lower extremities work lightly, as during active sitting, the resulting regular pumping action stimulates the return of lymphatic fluid, and minimizes lower leg edema and swollen ankles. Since movement allows blood to flow freely from the lower extremities, this improved circulation can reduce the risk of the development of deep vein thrombosis (DVT) while seated. Meanwhile, overall bodily movement may "shake out" muscle tension and stress that can build up in the neck, shoulders, or jaw during prolonged sitting postures. It is even thought that movement while sitting might improve focus and alertness because of the sensory and vestibular input.

== Rehabilitation ==
The concept of active and dynamic sitting has further relevance beyond those in the able-bodied population whose daily activity involves extended periods of sitting. For the population of wheelchair users, both children and adults, the topic of active, dynamic sitting is increasingly a subject of focused discussion, research, and product development.

For wheelchair users, prolonged sitting can have similar adverse effects and health issues as for the able-bodied. Wheelchair users are perhaps at even greater risk since their bodies are already limited due to their health condition. Thus, for wheelchair users, a less than optimal, prolonged static seated posture could be likely to lead to physical discomfort or to deterioration of health status.

The concept of dynamic or active sitting can apply to both the adult and pediatric populations in the field of rehabilitation. For the pediatric population, childhood is a time of significant physical and cognitive development, and appropriate intervention can impact long-term outcome. So particularly for young wheelchair users, it is crucial to also provide adaptive seating that accommodates their unique needs and enables active seated postural control and function. However, this need for appropriate adaptive seating is equally true for adult clients with diagnoses such as spinal injuries, stroke, cerebral palsy, multiple sclerosis, or brain injury.

Wheelchair users can have unique physical characteristics that pose specific challenges to both sitting posture and to upper extremity function. Hypertonia is high muscle tone that can vary in degree, and that can be influenced by excitement, stress, loud noise, external environmental factors, medication, or joint or body positioning. Spasticity and involuntary extensor thrusts can cause individuals to extend their joints, affecting and altering their seated position. An ill-fitting seating system can increase tone, since any noxious stimuli, such as irritation or pressure, can trigger hypertonicity. Additionally, repeated extensor thrusts against rigid chair parts can result in breakages in the wheelchair or adaptive seating.

A seat and/or backrest that moves dynamically can accommodate involuntary extensor thrusts, absorb the extensor tone and, through the movement of the seating system, dampen the overall impact of hypertonia on the body. Evidence suggests that using a dynamic backrest reduces the sacral sitting that results from the trunk sliding down with repeated extensor thrusting. Research shows that in dynamic seating, the control of upper extremity movement is actually improved as well.

The posterior-reclined position of traditional seating actually poses a postural challenge and results in poorer reaching efficiency. These findings further emphasize the importance of seating for positioning that will promote an active, dynamic seated posture. An investigation at the University of Twente indicated that anterior tilted pelvis postures potentially benefit the functional performance in daily wheelchair-use.

Since muscle tone varies from client to client, professional judgment is required in prescribing dynamic seating for children and adults with disabilities. In some cases, spasticity may be used by the individual for postural stabilizing. In such a case, extensor tone is incorporated into functional movement, and steps taken to reduce tone can result in reduced function. Utilizing wheelchairs or adaptive seating where the dynamic movement option can be locked out, gives the user or caregiver the option of choosing when to utilize the dynamic movement that is built into the seating system. While for some individuals, stability of the seating surfaces may be necessary for certain functions (such as while using a communication device or for self-feeding) it is becoming increasingly recognized in the field that movement while seated during other hours of the day is of value and benefit for health and function. An active seating system is dynamic, to enable the child to be properly positioned during and after moving while seated, promoting their overall function — and also dynamic enough to help prevent painful and damaging shear and the prolonged adverse pressure of immobility.

Hypotonia is low muscle tone, resulting in an inability to sustain controlled movement of the body against gravity, and can often manifest as poor trunk control. However, the appropriate use of positioning devices and physical therapy can help via motor learning to establish improved strength, postural stability and movement control. Early intervention can potentially have an impact in overcoming issues of hypotonia, for children who are identified and diagnosed early. Adaptive seating that enables active sitting may improve postural control, through practicing active trunk muscle use in relation to gravity. Says Cathy Mulholland, OTR/L, "Children who are non-ambulatory and who have not had the opportunity to develop anti-gravity postural musculature to maintain their body in a variety of postures, consistently have poor to fair muscle strength. It is not reasonable to expect the child to strengthen if they do not have the ability to move."
