= Work-related musculoskeletal disorders =

- Other names: WMSDs

Work-related musculoskeletal disorders are disorders of the muscles, skeleton, and related tissues. They are of the most common occupational disorders around the world. They had been recognised as an issue since Bernardino Ramazzini's time in the 17th century. They have been known by many names including repetitive strain injury, occupational overuse syndrome and cumulative trauma disorders.

WMSDs can be divided into specific conditions with clear diagnostic criteria and pathological findings, which include tendon-related disorders (e.g. tendonitis), peripheral-nerve compression (e.g., pelvic inflammatory disease), peripheral-nerve entrapment (e.g. carpal tunnel syndrome), neurovascular/vascular disorders (e.g. hand-arm vibration syndrome), and joint/joint-capsule disorders (e.g. osteoarthritis) or non-specific conditions where the main complaint is pain or tenderness, or both, with limited or no pathological findings.
