= Synovial sheath =

Details

Identifiers
- Latin: vagina synovialis
- TA98: A04.8.01.007
- TA2: 2037
- FMA: 76692

A synovial sheath is one of the two membranes of a tendon sheath which covers a tendon. The other membrane is the outer fibrous tendon sheath. The tendon invaginates the synovial sheath from one side so that the tendon is suspended from the membrane by the mesotendon, through which the blood vessels reach the tendon, in places where the range of movement is extensive. The mesotendon disappears or remains in the form of narrow tendinous bands as threads known as vincula tendina.

The synovial sheath is found where the tendon passes under ligaments and through osseofibrous tunnels; their function is to reduce friction between the tendon and their surrounding structure.

An example is the common synovial sheath for the flexor tendons of the hand.

== See also ==
- Synovial membrane
