= Vincula tendina =

Tendinous bands of the hand

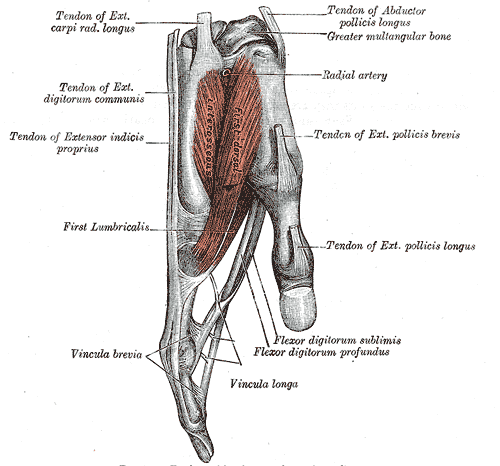
- Tendons of forefinger and vincula tendina. (Vincula brevia labeled at lower left; vincula longa labeled at bottom center.)

Details

Identifiers
- Latin: vincula tendinum digitorum manus
- TA98: A04.8.04.019
- TA2: 2588

Within each osseo-aponeurotic canal, the tendons of the flexor digitorum superficialis and flexor digitorum profundus are connected to each other, and to the phalanges, by slender, tendinous bands, called vincula tendina.

== Structure ==
There are around three to seven vincula for each flexor tendon. Vincula tendina can be classified into two types according to their morphology.

The vincula brevia (short), which are two in number in each finger, and consist of triangular bands of fibers, one connecting the tendon of the flexor digitorum superficialis to the front of the first interphalangeal joint and head of the first phalanx, and the other the tendon of the flexor digitorum profundus to the front of the second interphalangeal joint and head of the second phalanx.

The vincula longa (long and slender), one which connects the flexor digitorum superficialis to the base of the first phalanx, and the other which connects the under surfaces of the tendons of the flexor digitorum profundus to those of the subjacent flexor digitorum superficialis after the tendons of the former have passed through the latter.

== Function ==
The vincula tendina carry blood supply to the flexor digitorum superficialis and profundus tendons. The vincula breve helps facilitate digital flexion following injury to the distal flexor digitorum profundus tendon.

== Additional images ==
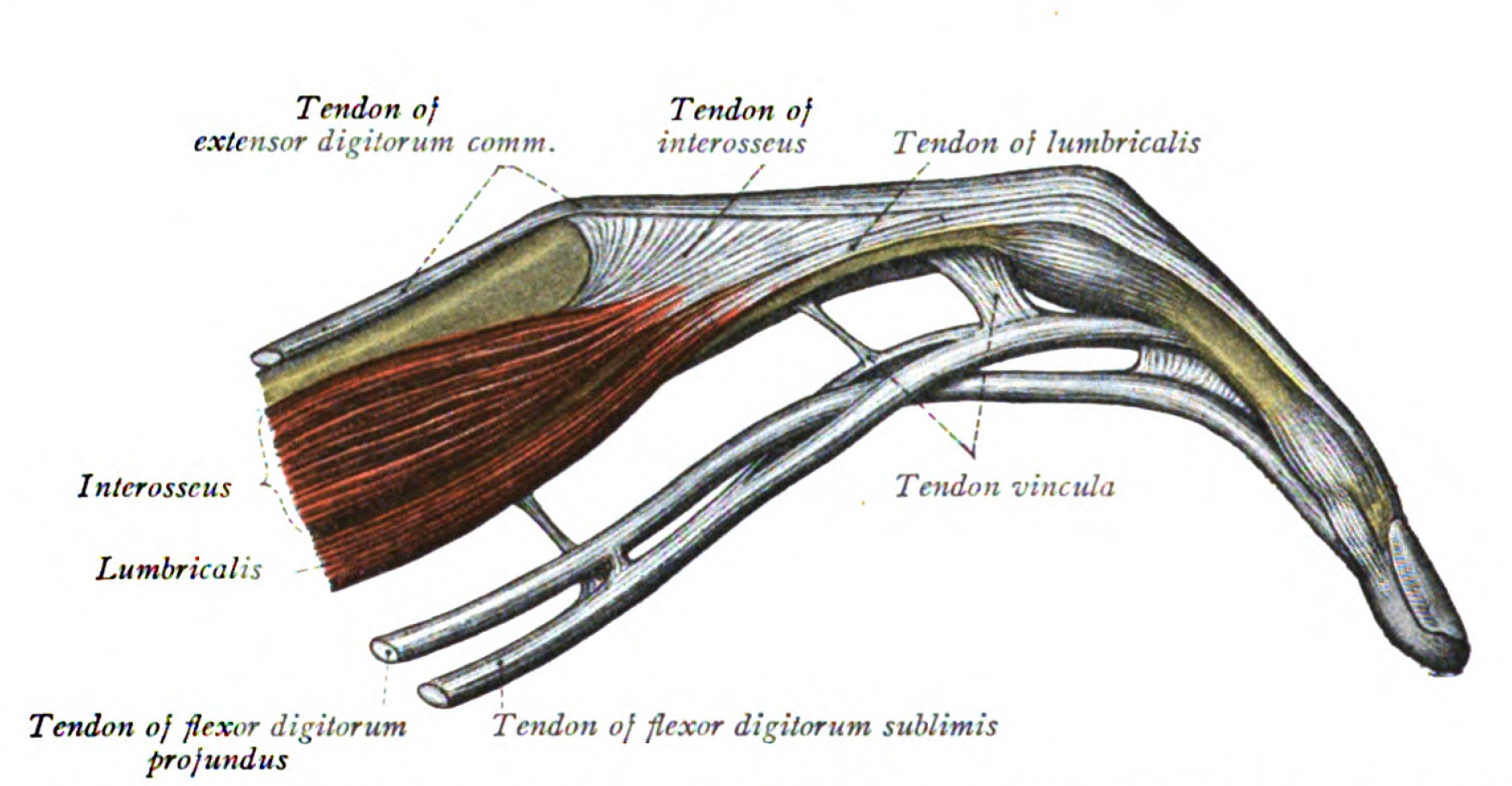

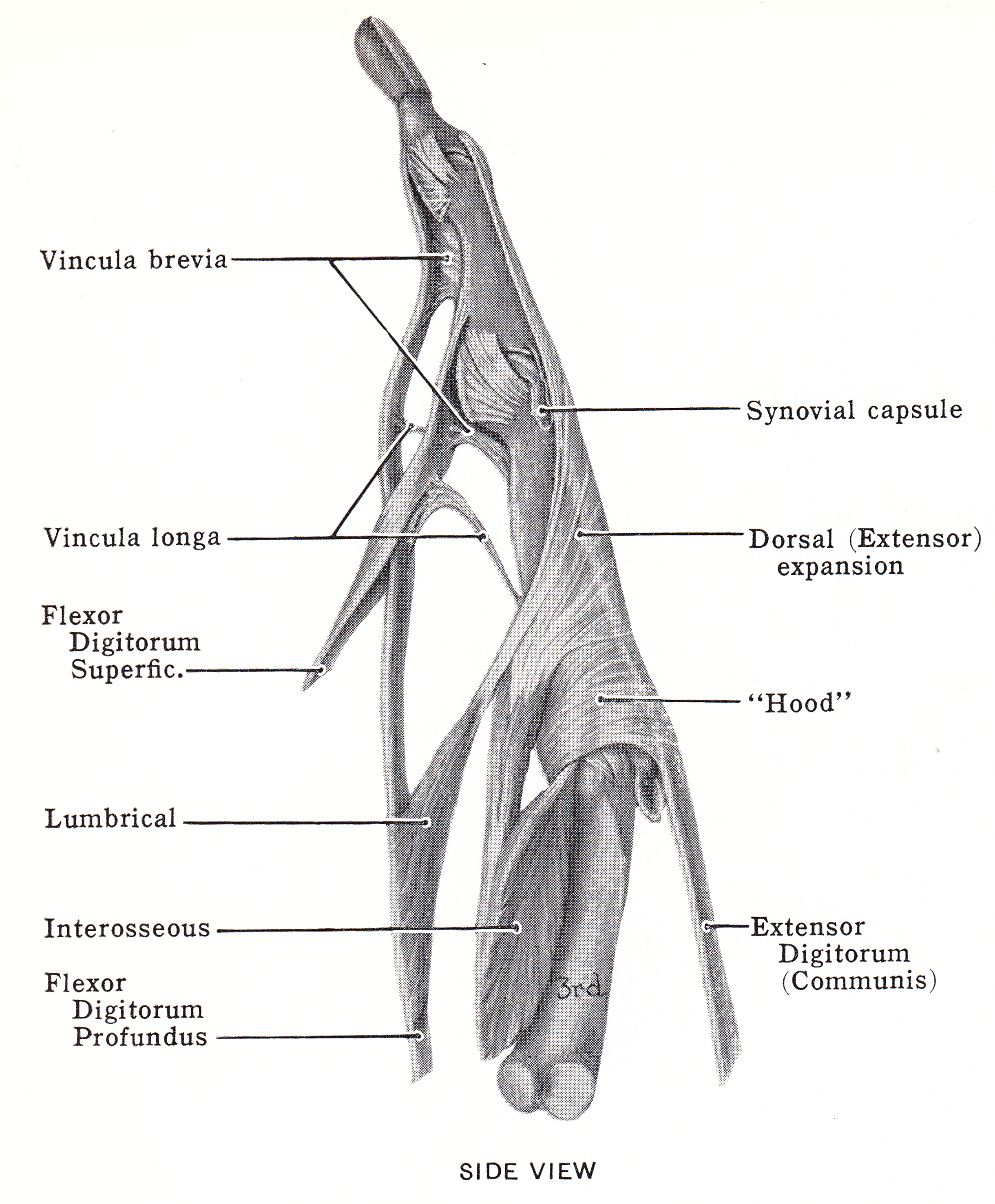
