= Annular ligaments of fingers =

Ring sheaths surrounding the finger tendons in the palm

- Annular (A1-A5) and cruciform (C0-C3) ligaments of the tendon sheath over the flexor tendons of the index finger of the left hand.

Details
- From: Phalanx
- To: Phalanx

Identifiers
- Latin: ligamentum anulare digitorum pars anularis vaginae fibrosae digitorum manus

In human anatomy, the annular ligaments of the fingers, often referred to as A pulleys, are the annular part of the fibrous sheathes of the fingers. Four or five such annular pulleys, together with three cruciate pulleys, form a fibro-osseous tunnel on the palmar aspect of the hand through which passes the deep and superficial flexor tendons. The annular and cruciate ligaments serve to govern the flexor mechanism of the hand and wrist, providing critical constraints to the flexor tendons to prevent bowstringing upon contraction and excursion of extrinsic flexor musculo-tendinous units.

The first annular pulley (A1 pulley), near the head of the metacarpal bone, lies in the flexor groove in the deep transverse metacarpal ligament. As a general rule, the A1, A3, and A5 pulleys in the fingers are "joint pulleys" that originate from the volar plate on the volar aspect of the metacarpophalangeal, proximal interphalangeal, and distal interphalangeal joints, respectively. The A2 and A4 pulleys arise from the periosteum on the proximal half of the proximal phalanx and the mid portion of the middle phalanx, respectively. The first annular pulley (A1 pulley), near the head of the metacarpal bone, lies in the flexor groove in the deep transverse metacarpal ligament. In the thumb there are two annular pulleys and a single oblique pulley.

Together, the A pulleys form a continuous tunnel and, because each A pulley's attachments on the bone is wider than its roof, its shape prevents the pulley from pinching its neighbours at extremes of flexion. The short roof also minimises pressure on the tendon under tension, instead distributing pressure throughout the tunnel.
