= Tendon sheath =

Lubricating fluid membrane around a tendon

Details
- System: Musculoskeletal

Identifiers
- Latin: vagina tendinis
- TA98: A04.8.01.005
- TA2: 2035
- TH: H3.03.00.0.00028
- FMA: 76715

A tendon sheath is a collagen structure with a lining of synovial membrane that helps a tendon have greater mechanical advantage. The synovial membrane produces a lubricating fluid (synovial fluid) that facilitates smooth motions of the tendon during muscle contraction and joint movements.
