= Sprained wrist =

- Other names: Twisted wrist, pulled wrist
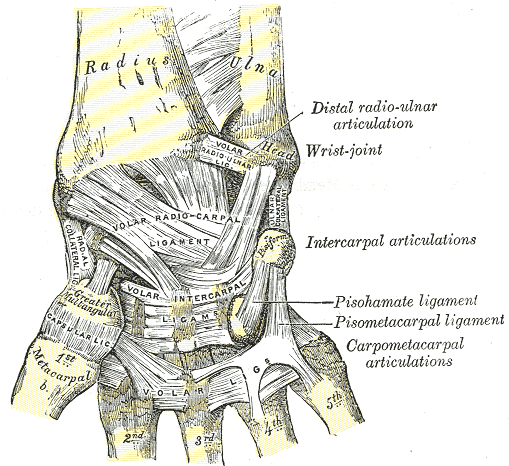
- Ligaments of the wrist
- Specialty: Orthopedics, Sports medicine, Physical medicine and rehabilitation, Family medicine
- Symptoms: Swelling, bruising, pain
- Causes: Overstretching or tearing of wrist ligaments, commonly due to falls or sports injuries
- Diagnostic method: Physical examination
- Differential diagnosis: Wrist fracture, Carpel tunnel syndrome
- Treatment: Physical medicine and rehabilitation

A sprained wrist (also called a twisted wrist or pulled wrist) is an injury in which one or more ligaments in the wrist joint are stretched or torn. It is a common injury during sporting activities and after a fall onto an outstretched hand. Severity ranges from mild ligament stretching to complete rupture.

== Signs and symptoms ==
The common symptoms include pain, weakness, bruising, swelling, and reduced range of motion. Pain is typically made more prominent with movement or weight-bearing activities involving the hand. In the more severe cases, a sensation of popping at the time of sudden injury may be reported, which may indicate a grade 3 sprain. Symptoms can overlap with other forms of wrist injuries such as fractures, and X-ray imaging may be required to reliably confirm a diagnosis by ruling out other types of injuries.

== Cause ==
Wrist sprains occur when traumatic forces stretch or tear the ligaments of the wrist. The most common causes are falls in which a person attempts to use their hand to break their fall and the wrist absorbs the impact, causing the wrist to bend backwards (hyperextend) or twist forcefully, resulting in damaged wrist ligaments. Such incidents are common in sports-related activities like cycling, gymnastics, basketball and skateboarding, but can occur in anyone.

Chronic, repetitive, and heavy loading of the wrist in sports may also increase the risks of sprains. For example in weight-lifting, moving a heavy weight beyond the wrist's normal range of motion can cause a sprain. A sprain may occur suddenly or after repeated stress on the ligaments over time. In occupational settings, workers who repeatedly stress their wrists with forceful motions without adequate rest can gradually weaken the ligaments, increasing their odds of sprains. Motor vehicle collisions that include impact with airbag deployment and forceful bending of the wrists can cause wrist sprains.

== Diagnosis ==
A healthcare professional may ask a patient about their symptoms and what may have caused the injury. Physical examinations may be used to check for pain, wrist instability and range of movement to assess the severity of the sprain. A doctor may also suggest imaging tests including X-rays, MRI scans, ultrasound, and diagnostic arthroscopy, to confirm a diagnosis.

Though X-rays are unable to see ligaments, they can be used to confirm whether the wrist bones line up properly, as an incorrect alignment may indicate a ligament injury. An arthrogram involves a special dye to be injected into the wrist joint to make both the joints and ligaments more visible during imaging.

Wrist sprains can be confused with wrist strains as the pain and symptoms can be similar. The fundamental difference between the two are that sprains involve the stretching or tearing of ligaments, whereas strains involve the stretching or tearing of muscles or tendons in the wrist. A doctor would require a thorough physical examination to distinguish between the two.

=== Classification of severity ===
Wrist sprains are commonly classified by severity:

- Grade 1 (Mild): Mild stretching of ligaments without tearing or small amount of tearing, minimal swelling and mild pain.
- Grade 2 (Moderate): Partial ligament tearing with moderate pain, swelling, tenderness and reduced functionality.
- Grade 3 (Severe): Complete ligament rupture with significant pain, swelling and joint instability.

== Treatment ==
Most cases are mild (Grade 1) and do not require surgery and a visit to the doctor may not be necessary. Immobilization and rehabilitative exercises may be advised by healthcare professionals and in rare severe cases, surgery is performed to help achieve a reasonable outcome. Management of wrist sprains increasingly emphasizes functional treatment, which is based on the principle of load or activity management.

=== R.I.C.E. ===
The traditional treatment is the standard RICE protocol for soft tissue injuries: rest, ice, compression, and elevation.

However, evidence supporting its effectiveness is limited. Some experts, including Gabe Mirkin who coined the term RICE, cautions against the use of icing, and argue that it may be an outdated and counterproductive method that delays the healing process rather than speeding it up, as studies have found that the inflammation it reduces is actually necessary for repairing damaged tissues. Additionally ibuprofen and aspirin that both reduces inflammation, may also delay healing, though it can be taken to help reduce pain and swelling.

=== Light exercise / mobility exercises ===
The idea of using light exercises to manage wrist sprains is based on the concept of load management, which favours a gradual pain-limited return to activity over periods of complete immobilization or rest, which may lead to muscle weakness and deconditioning.

During the initial phase, gentle modified movements are permitted as long as they do not clearly worsen pain. The aim of such treatment is not to strengthen muscles but rather to increase function. After the acute phase, the patient may try more normal activities as long as they don't aggravate pain and in particular, pain-free aerobic exercise to help increase blood flow to the injured area. Examples of such movements can include walking or cycling at low intensity. As symptoms improve, weight bearing exercises may be introduced at the appropriate intensity and duration.

=== Immobilization ===
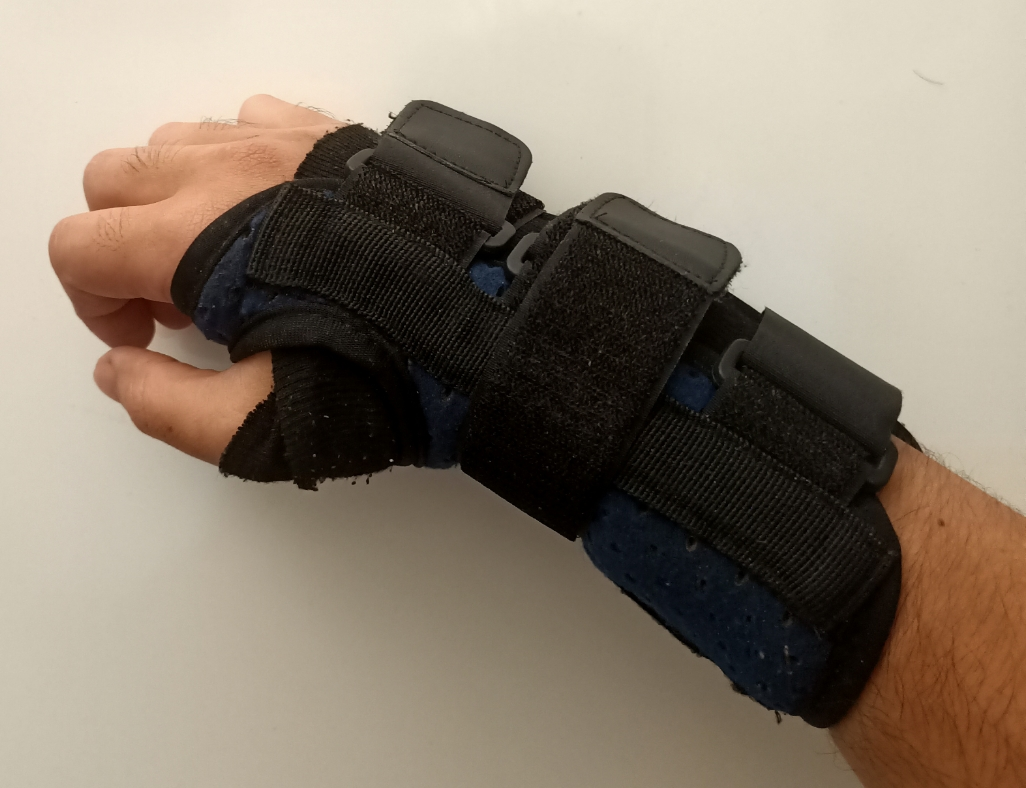
Wrist brace used to immobilize and support a sprained wrist.

A healthcare provider may recommend wearing a splint or brace to help keep the wrist in a neutral straight position as it heals. The immobilization restricts movement and helps prevent further trauma and stress to the joint, allowing one to continue with daily activities with less pain. The duration of immobilization varies depending on severity of injury however wearing a brace or splint for prolonged periods can lead to a "frozen" or stiff joint.

=== Wrist sprain surgery ===
Surgery is rarely done for wrist sprains but surgical repair or reconstruction may be indicated in selected cases. Wrist sprain surgery may involve arthroscopy, a minimally invasive procedure where a small incision is made to the wrist and a micro-camera is put inside to allow the doctor to look inside. Tiny instruments are also inserted to repair the wrist's ligaments and joint. More severe cases would involve open surgery where a surgeon will make a cut to the back of the wrist, and then sets the bones to their correct position, and repair damaged ligaments.

== Prognosis ==
With treatment, early symptom improvements may be observed within days. Low grade sprains typically recover fully after several weeks. Moderate sprains can take longer to heal and may necessitate surgical treatment for patients with a poor rate of recovery.

Surgical intervention may also be required for severe sprains however for certain cases, surgery cannot repair all the damages, resulting in permanent functional limitation. Untreated ligament sprains may also result in arthritis in the wrist over time.

Complications may also occur if activity is resumed before the sprain is properly healed. For example, in a scapholunate ligament injury, a form of wrist sprain that affects the ligament between the scaphoid and lunate bones - returning to activity before the wrist is fully healed, can result in chronic wrist instability due to the ligament being healed in a stretched or weakened position.

== Epidemiology ==
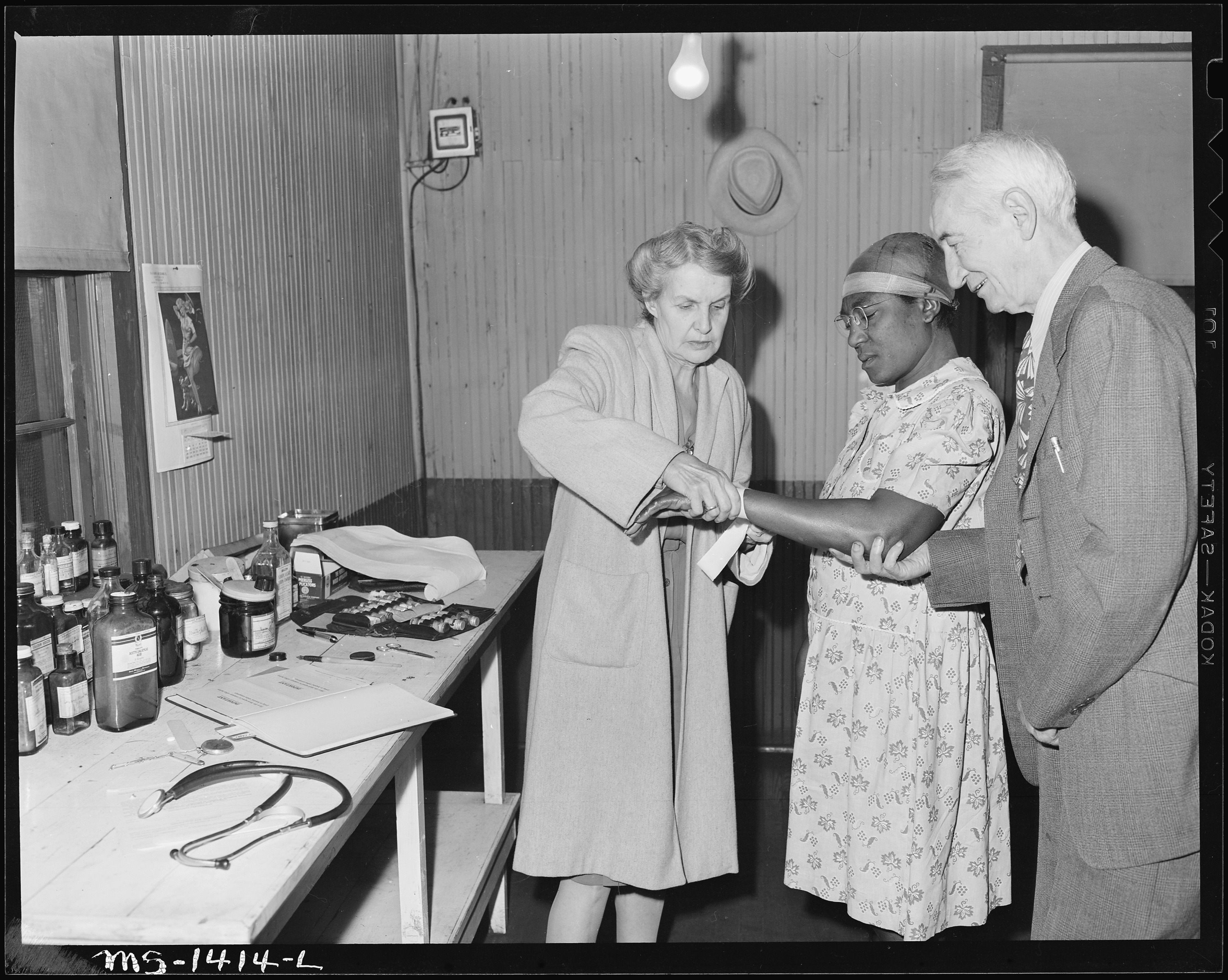
A healthcare provider applying a wrist brace to support a sprained wrist, 1946.

Wrist sprains are common injuries, most prominently among athletes and those engaged in physically demanding activities in occupational settings. But they can also occur during any daily life activity.

Data from the United States National Collegiate Athletic Association (NCAA) Injury Surveillance Program that recorded injuries in 25 US collegiate sports, between the academic years 2004–2005 to 2013–2014, found wrist sprains were among the most frequently reported severe hand and wrist injuries, accounting for roughly one in seven such injuries.

== Prevention ==
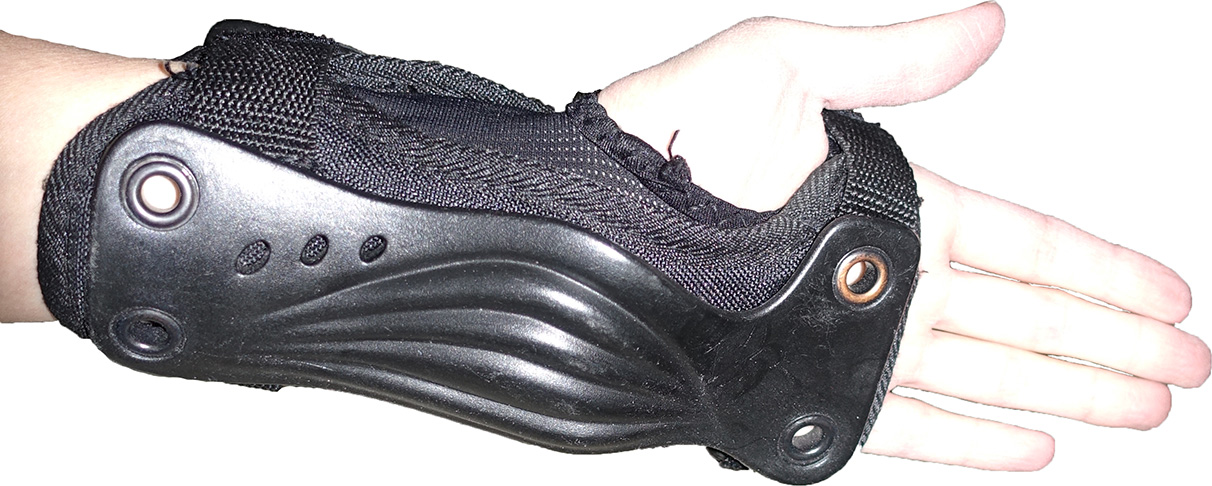
An adult-size wrist-guard whose hard plastic splint is six inches long, which enables the forearm and palm to absorb the impact of a fast fall.

In high-risk sports like snowboarding, skiing, and skateboarding where wrist sprain injuries are common, preventative measures include the use of protective tape or wrist guards that helps stabilize the wrist and limit excessive backward bending during falls.

Having strong wrists can also reduce the odds of getting wrist sprains. A doctor or physiotherapist may recommend appropriate wrist exercises for a patient, that can include wrist flexion, extension, and gripping motions, to help build proprioception and strengthen the muscles surrounding the wrist.

== See also ==
- Kienböck's disease
- Wrist drop
