= Gabe Mirkin =

US sports medicine/health journalist & MD

Gabe Baron Mirkin (born June 18, 1935) is an American physician, author, and health journalist. He is best known for his work in sports medicine, his long-running syndicated health and fitness column and radio program, and for coining the acronym RICE (rest, ice, compression, and elevation) for the treatment of soft-tissue injuries.

Mirkin is known for his recommendations for both standard medicine and his non-standard recommendations on health concerns, and for critiquing preliminary research. Due to his unconventional recommendations, he also receives criticism from other doctors. He later revised some of his original recommendations, including cautioning against routine icing and prolonged rest in 2014, noting that these practices can delay recovery by interfering with the body's natural inflammatory healing process.

== Education ==
Mirkin is a graduate of Harvard University and the Baylor University College of Medicine. He is board-certified in four areas: allergy and immunology, pediatrics, pediatric allergy, and a now-defunct board of sports medicine. He did his residency at the Massachusetts General Hospital, and fellowship at Johns Hopkins.

== Career ==
=== Teaching ===
Mirkin served as an assistant professor at the University of Maryland, teaching a course based on his book The Sportsmedicine Book from 1976 to 1980. He served as a teaching fellow at Johns Hopkins Medical School, and an associate clinical professor in pediatrics at the Georgetown University School of Medicine in Washington, D.C.

=== Writing ===
Mirkin wrote The Sportsmedicine Book, which discusses proper diet, exercise, and sports injuries. He has written a total of 16 books, and has written a chapter on sports medicine for the Merck Manual.

Mirkin has written a number of syndicated columns on sports medicine which appeared weekly in 31 newspapers, and was a contributor in a monthly column for The Runner magazine. His monthly journal, the Mirkin Report, reportedly had over 25,000 subscribers.

==== The Sportsmedicine Book ====
One of Mirkin's books (written in collaboration with Marshall Hoffman), The Sportsmedicine Book, discusses and exposes the prevailing myths of sports medicine, and offers what Mirkin considers to be useful facts in their place.

=== Radio hosting ===
Mirkin was offered his own regular radio show by WCAU executives in December 1978. A mini-studio was built in his home from which he broadcast live via a remote hookup with the station every weeknight. Based on ratings, the show was most popular among people aged 35 to 64.

Mirkin had a program on the Talk America Radio Networks that was broadcast by over 75 stations in the United States and Canada. His show centered on callers asking questions regarding health, fitness, and nutrition.

He has also had a daily fitness feature called Dr. Gabe Mirkin on Fitness broadcast for CBS Radio News during the 1970s.

==== American talk radio networks ====
In July 2019, on Talk Radio 98.5 WRTA's The 11th Hour with Doug Herendeen, Mirkin discussed a possible solution to Alzheimer's disease. On the show, he discussed medical articles sent by Herendeen, the host, and shared his opinion on a suggested possible alternative method to treat Alzheimer's disease. Mirkin also interacted with callers to discuss their ailments, and to provide recommendations, along with further medical knowledge.

=== RICE ===
In 1978, Gabe Mirken coined the acronym RICE (rest, ice, compression, and elevation), a regime used for acute soft-tissue injuries, which became widely adopted in first-aid and sports medicine guidance. For decades, RICE was primarily recommended for the initial management of sprains, strains, and similar injuries. In 2014, Mirkin publicly revised his views on the routine use of icing and prolonged rest after reviewing research on inflammation and tissue healing, stating that these practises may delay recovery by interfering with the body's natural healing process.

== Controversies ==
=== Antibiotics as cure for rheumatoid arthritis ===
Mirkin's syndicated column in The Philadelphia Inquirer was dropped in 1976 due to receiving angry letters fueled by Mirkin's non-standard advice on treating rheumatoid arthritis with antibiotics, and other matters, along with the suspicion that he did not have a large readership. When questioned about the decision, Joseph Gambardello, Inquirer deputy features editor, said that "It seemed as if Mirkin was, on any particular subject, just focusing on one possible cure or treatment without recognizing the possibility that the condition might have been something else, might have required other treatments, or that there even were other treatments."

Mirkin's views were supported by a study presented to the American College of Rheumatology in November 1997, where the early administration of an antibiotic showed significant improvements in the swollen, painful joints of rheumatoid arthritis.

Before this study, Warner Barth, chairman of rheumatology at the Washington Hospital Center, endorsed the then-standard view that rheumatoid arthritis is not caused by infection. According to Barth at that time, the benefits patients saw from antibiotics appeared to come from the drugs' anti-inflammatory properties. Mirkin, however, continued to insist that rheumatoid arthritis is caused by infection. Since the 1997 findings were released, Barth has stated that he has a somewhat more positive opinion of the treatment, but remains wary of it.
