= Sprain =

Soft tissue injury of a ligament

- Other names: Torn ligament, distortion
- Specialty: Sports medicine, physical medicine & rehabilitation, orthopedics, family medicine, emergency medicine
- Symptoms: Pain, swelling, bruising, joint instability, limited range of motion of the injured joint
- Duration: Mild cases – few days to six weeks Severe cases – few weeks to months
- Causes: Trauma, sports injuries, overuse, environmental hazards
- Risk factors: Environmental factors, age, poor training or sports gear
- Diagnostic method: Physical exam, joint x-ray
- Differential diagnosis: Strain, fracture
- Prevention: Frequent stretching and conditioning, bracing at risk joints during exercise
- Treatment: Rest, ice, compression, elevation, NSAIDs
- Medication: Non-steroidal anti-inflammatory drugs (NSAIDs)
- Prognosis: Mild injuries resolve well on their own. Severe injuries likely require surgery and physical therapy.

A sprain is a soft tissue injury of the ligaments within a joint, often caused by a sudden movement abruptly forcing the joint to exceed its functional range of motion. Ligaments are tough, inelastic fibers made of collagen that connect two or more bones to form a joint and are important for joint stability and proprioception, which is the body's sense of limb position and movement. Sprains may be mild (first degree), moderate (second degree), or severe (third degree), with the latter two classes involving some degree of tearing of the ligament. Sprains can occur at any joint but most commonly occur in the ankle, knee, or wrist. An equivalent injury to a muscle or tendon is known as a strain.

The majority of sprains are mild, causing minor swelling and bruising that can be resolved with conservative treatment, typically summarized as RICE: rest, ice, compression, elevation. However, severe sprains involve complete tears, ruptures, or avulsion fractures, often leading to joint instability, severe pain, and decreased functional ability. These sprains require surgical fixation, prolonged immobilization, and physical therapy.

== Signs and symptoms ==
- Pain
- Swelling
- Bruising or hematoma caused by broken blood vessels within the injured ligament
- Joint instability
- Difficulty with bearing weight
- Decreased functional ability or range of motion of the injured joint
- Ligament rupture may cause a cracking or popping sound at the time of injury

Knowing the signs and symptoms of a sprain can be helpful in differentiating the injury from a strain or simple fracture. Strains typically present with pain, cramping, muscle spasm, and muscle weakness, and fractures typically present with bone tenderness, especially when bearing weight.

== Causes ==
Acute sprains typically occur when the joint is abruptly forced beyond its functional range of motion, often in the setting of trauma or sports injuries. The most common cause of sprains in general is repetitive movements (overuse).

=== Mechanism ===
Ligaments are collagen fibers that connect bones together, providing passive stabilization to a joint. These fibers can be found in various organizational patterns (parallel, oblique, spiral, etc.) depending on the function of the joint involved. Ligaments can be extra-capsular (located outside the joint capsule), capsular (continuation of the joint capsule), or intra-articular (located within a joint capsule). The location has important implications for healing as blood flow to intra-articular ligaments is diminished compared to extra-capsular or capsular ligaments.

Collagen fibers have about a 4% elastic zone where fibers stretch out with increased load on the joint. However, exceeding this elastic limit causes a rupture of fibers, leading to a sprain. It is important to recognize that ligaments adapt to training by increasing the cross-sectional area of fibers. When a ligament is immobilized, the ligament has been shown to rapidly weaken. Normal daily activity is important for maintaining about 80–90% of the mechanical properties of a ligament.

=== Risk factors ===
- Fatigue and overuse
- High-intensity contact sports
- Environmental factors
- Poor conditioning or equipment
- Age and genetic predisposition to ligament injuries
- Lack of stretching or "warming up", which when performed properly increases blood flow and joint flexibility

== Diagnosis ==
Sprains can often be diagnosed clinically based on the patient's signs and symptoms, mechanism of injury, and physical examination. However, x-rays can be obtained to help identify fractures, especially in cases of tenderness or bone pain at the injured site. In some instances, particularly if the healing process is prolonged or a more serious injury is suspected, magnetic resonance imaging (MRI) is performed to look at the surrounding soft tissue and ligaments.

=== Classification ===
1. First degree sprain (mild) – There is minor stretching and structural damage to the ligament, leading to mild swelling and bruising. Patients typically present without joint instability or decreased range of motion of the joint.
2. Second degree sprain (moderate) – There is a partial tear of the affected ligament. Patients typically experience moderate swelling, tenderness, and some instability of the joint. There may be some difficulty bearing weight on the affected joint.
3. Third degree sprain (severe) – There is a complete rupture or tear of the ligament, sometimes avulsing a piece of bone. Patients typically experience severe joint instability, pain, bruising, swelling, and inability to apply weight to the joint.

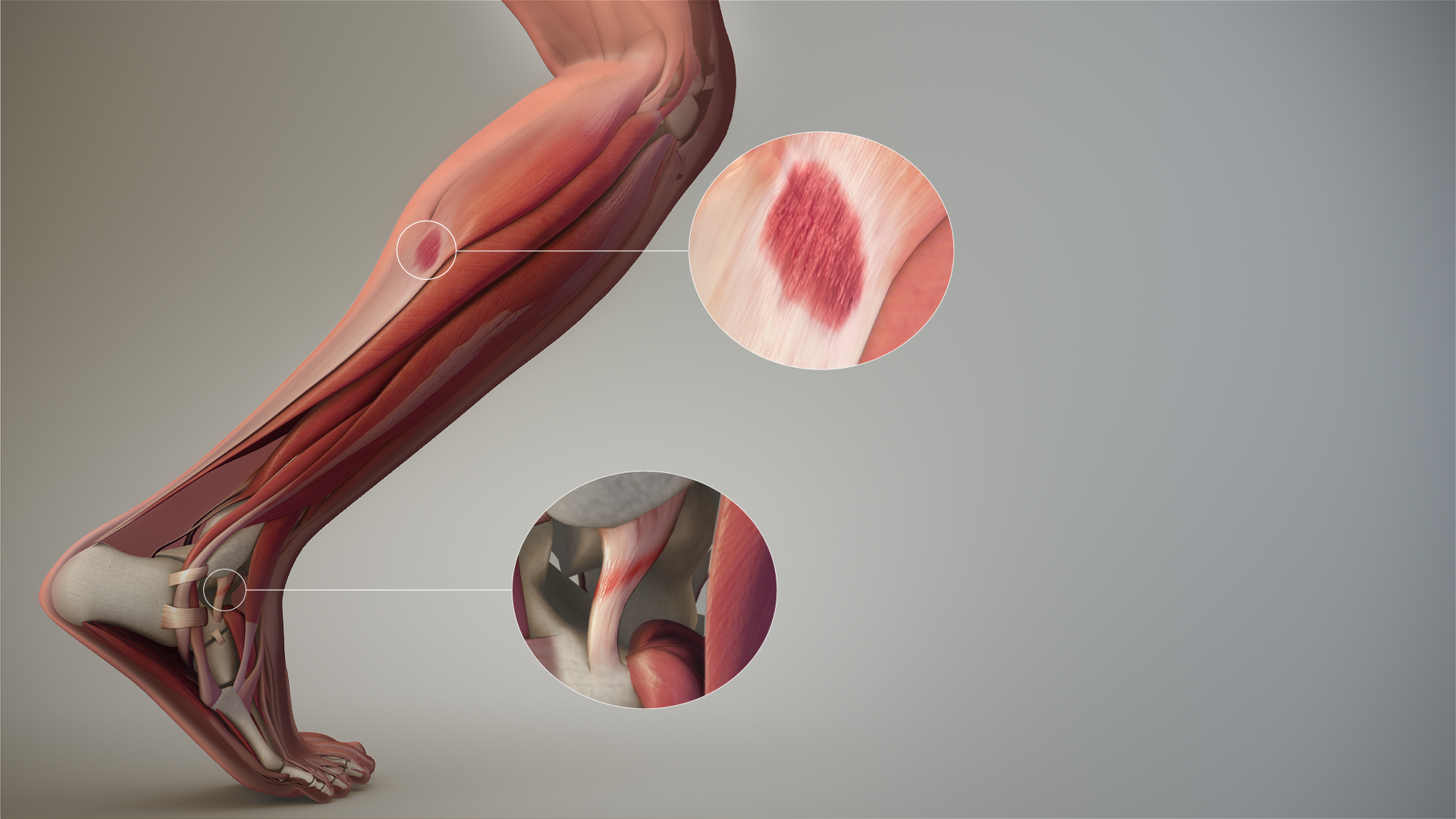
Three-dimensional animation illustrating a sprain

=== Joints involved ===
Although any joint can experience a sprain, some of the more common injuries include the following:

- Ankle – Sprains most commonly occur at the ankle and can take longer to heal than ankle bone fractures. Most sprained ankles usually occur in the lateral ligaments on the outside of the ankle. Common causes include walking on uneven surfaces or during contact sports. See sprained ankle or high ankle sprain for more details.
  - Inversion Ankle Sprain – injury that occurs when ankle rolls inward
  - Eversion Ankle Sprain – injury that occurs when ankle rolls outward
- Toes
  - Turf toe (metatarsophalangeal joint sprain) – forced hyperextension of the big toe upwards, especially during sports (initiating a sprint on a hard surface)

- Knee – Sprains commonly occur at the knee, especially following intense pivoting on a planted leg during contact sports (American football, football, basketball, pole vaulting, softball, baseball and some styles of martial arts).
  - Anterior cruciate ligament (ACL) injury
  - Posterior cruciate ligament (PCL) injury
  - Medial collateral ligament (MCL) injury
  - Lateral collateral ligament (LCL) injury
  - Superior Tibiofibular Joint Sprain – typically caused by a twisting injury to the joint connecting the tibia (shinbone) and fibula
  - Patellar dislocation

- Fingers and wrists – Wrist sprains are injuries that involves stretching or tearing of one or more ligaments in the wrist joint. They commonly occur after a fall onto an outstretched hand (FOOSH). See also sprained wrist.
  - Gamekeeper's thumb (Skier's thumb) – forceful grabbing that leads to an injury to the ulnar collateral ligament (UCL) at the metacarpophalangeal (MCP) joint of the thumb, historically found in Scottish gamekeepers
- Elbow – Sprains occur when one or more ligaments around the elbow are torn or stretched.
  - Ulnar collateral ligament injury of the elbow are commonly caused by trauma or sudden twisting.
- Spine
  - Neck sprain at the cervical vertebrae
  - Whiplash (Traumatic Cervical Spine Syndrome) – forced hyperextension and flexion of the neck, classically found in rear-end auto accidents
  - Back sprain – Back sprains are one of the most common medical complaints, often caused by poor lifting mechanics and weak core muscles.

== Treatment ==
Treatment of sprains usually involves incorporating conservative measures to reduce the signs and symptoms of sprains, surgery to repair severe tears or ruptures, and rehabilitation to restore function to the injured joint. Although most sprains can be managed without surgery, severe injuries may require tendon grafting or ligament repair based on the individual's circumstances. The amount of rehabilitation and time needed for recovery will depend on the severity of the sprain.

A foot sprain is an injury to the ligaments that connect bones within the foot. The recovery process for a foot sprain is crucial for restoring normal function and preventing future injuries. This article outlines the general approach to foot sprain recovery, which varies depending on the severity of the injury.

=== Non-surgical ===
Depending on the mechanism of injury, joint involvement, and severity, most sprains can be treated using conservative measures following the acronym RICE within the first 24 hours of sustaining an injury. However, it is important to recognize that treatments should be individualized depending on the patient's particular injury and symptoms. Over-the-counter medications such as non-steroidal anti-inflammatory drugs (NSAIDs) can help relieve pain, and topical NSAIDs can be as effective as medications taken by mouth.

- Protect: The injured site should be protected and immobilized, as there is an increased risk of recurrent injury to the affected ligaments.
- Rest: The joint affected should be immobilized and bearing weight should be minimized. For example, walking should be limited in cases of sprained ankles.
- Ice: Ice should be applied immediately to the sprain to reduce swelling and pain. Ice can be applied 3–4 times a day for 10–15 minutes at a time or until the swelling subsides and can be combined with a wrapping for support. Ice can also be used to numb pain but should only be applied for a short period of time (less than twenty minutes) for this purpose. Prolonged ice exposure can reduce blood flow to the injured area and slow the healing process.
- Compression: Dressings, bandages, or wraps should be used to immobilize the sprain and provide support. When wrapping the injury, more pressure should be applied to the distal end of the injury and decrease in the direction of the heart. This helps circulate the blood from the extremities to the heart. Careful management of swelling through cold compression therapy is critical to the healing process by preventing further pooling of fluid in the sprained area. However, compression should not impede circulation of the limb.
- Elevation: Keeping the sprained joint elevated (in relation to the rest of the body) can minimize swelling.

Other non-operative therapies including the continuous passive motion machine (moves joint without patient exertion) and cryocuff (type of cold compress that is activated similarly to a blood pressure cuff) have been effective in reducing swelling and improving range of motion. Recent studies have shown that traction is just as effective as the RICE technique in treating ankle sprains in pediatric patients.

=== Functional rehabilitation ===
The components of an effective rehabilitation program for all sprain injuries include increasing the range of motion of the affected joint and progressive muscle strengthening exercises. After implementing conservative measures to reduce swelling and pain, mobilizing the limb within 48–72 hours following injury has been shown to promote healing by stimulating growth factors in musculoskeletal tissues linked to cellular division and matrix remodeling.

Prolonged immobilization can delay the healing of a sprain, as it usually leads to muscle atrophy and weakness. Although prolonged immobilization can have a negative effect on recovery, a study in 1996 suggest that the use of bracing can improve healing by alleviating pain and stabilizing the injury to prevent further damage to the ligament or re-injury. When using a brace, it is necessary to ensure adequate blood flow to the extremity. Ultimately, the goal of functional rehabilitation is to return the patient to full daily activities while minimizing the risk of re-injury.
