= Pulled hamstring =

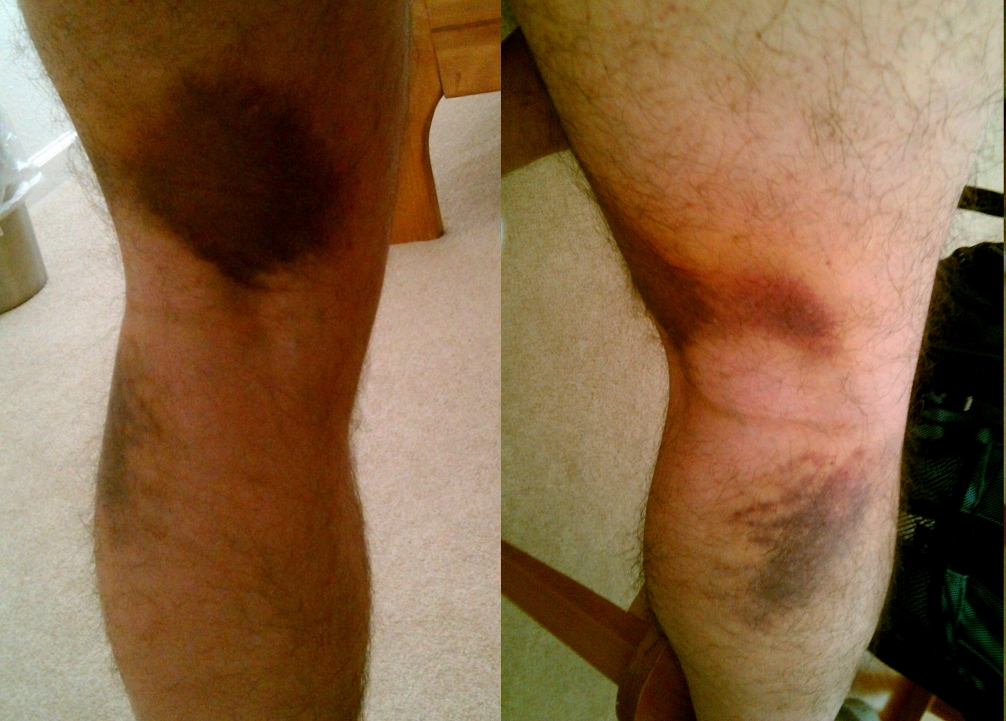
- Two images of the same strain. One of the pictures was shot through a mirror.

Straining of the hamstring, also known as a pulled hamstring, is defined as an excessive stretch or tear of muscle fibers and related tissues. Hamstring injuries are common in athletes participating in many sports. Track and field athletes are particularly at risk, as hamstring injuries have been estimated to make up 29% of all injuries in sprinters. Hamstring injuries can also come with a hip injury from sprinting. Symptoms for a hip injury are pain, aching and discomfort while running or any physical exercise.

The biceps femoris long head is at the most risk for injury, possibly due to its reduced moment of knee and hip flexion as compared to the medial hamstrings.

== Causes of hamstring strain ==
The muscle group is prone to injuries due to the explosive nature of movement in sports and thus causing overload and overstretching of the hamstring musculature.

The other causes may be:

- Previous injury
- Poor muscle strength
- Poor flexibility
- Inadequate warm-up
- Fatigue
- Imbalance
- Overuse

This condition is most commonly seen in:

- Athletes involved in football, baseball, American football, rugby
- Dancers and water skiers
- Sports involving cross-country skiing, downhill skiing, judo, cricket, and bull riding

== Diagnosis ==
=== Grades ===
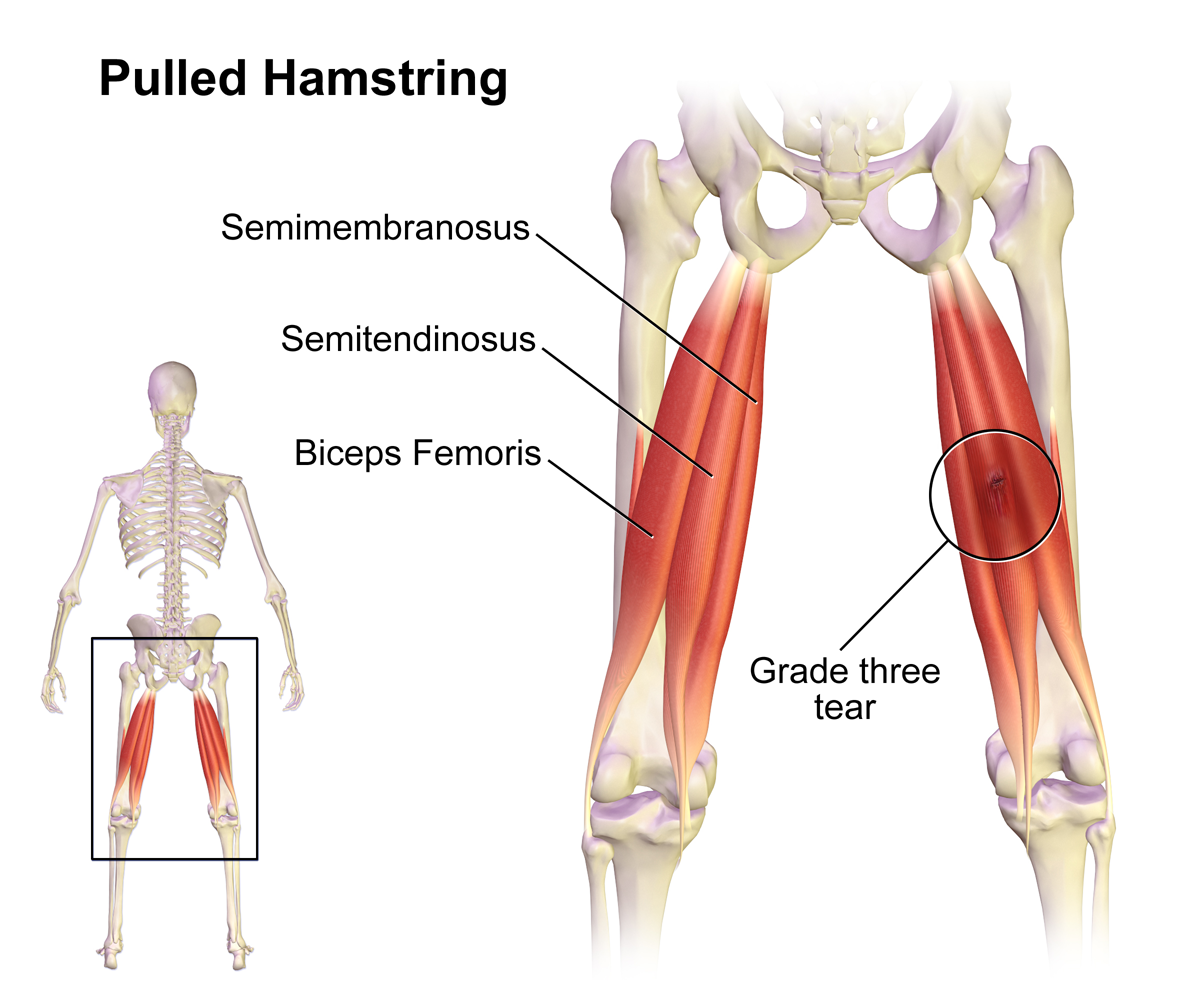
Pulled hamstring

==== Grade 1 ====
Sensation of cramp or tightness and a slight feeling of pain when the muscles are stretched or contracted.

==== Grade 2 ====
With a grade two hamstring strain there is immediate pain which is more severe than the pain of a grade one injury. It is confirmed by pain on stretch, swelling and contraction of the muscle.

==== Grade 3 ====
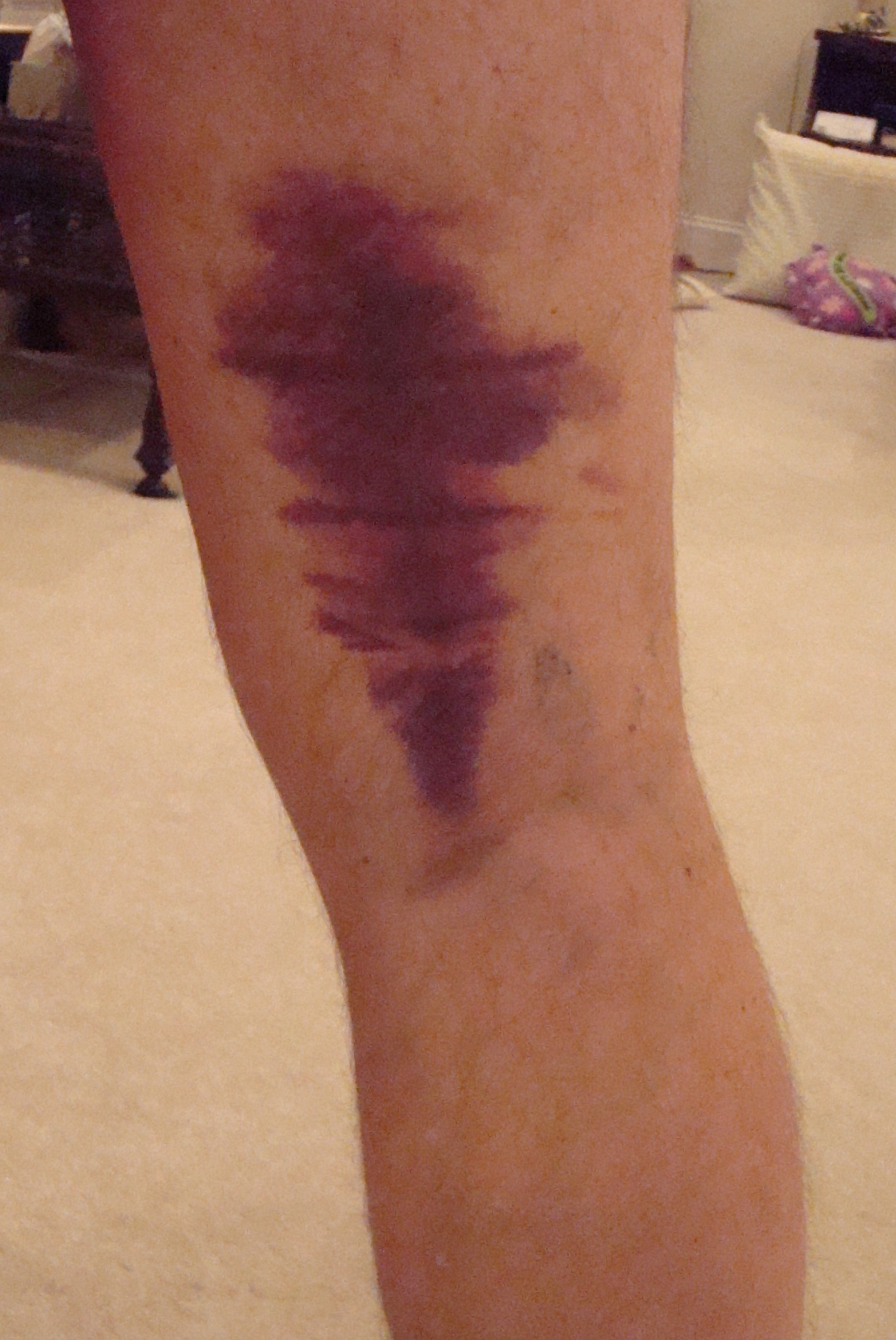
Bruising due to strained hamstring; horizontal lines show where bandage was.

A grade three hamstring strain is a severe injury. There is an immediate burning or stabbing pain and the individual is unable to walk without pain. The muscle is completely torn and there may be a large lump of muscle tissue above a depression where the tear is.

After a few days with grade two and three injuries, a large bruise may appear below the injury site caused by the bleeding within the tissues.

== Treatment ==
Recommended treatment for this injury consists of the RICE protocol: rest, ice, compression and elevation. The RICE method is primarily used to reduce bleeding and damage within the muscle tissue. Lower grade strains can easily become worse if the hamstring is not rested properly. Complete ruptures require surgical repair and rehabilitation.

Initial treatment of the injury, regardless of the severity of the strain, is the same. Within the first five days, the hamstring is rested in an elevated position with an ice pack applied for twenty minutes every two hours. A compression bandage is applied to limit bleeding and swelling in the tissues. After five days of rest, active rehabilitation begins.

== Epidemiology ==
An academic study found that the most common and prevalent musculoskeletal injury in the world is a hamstring strain. The study further explains that hamstring strains represented 15% of all injuries per club per season also had a 34% chance of recurrence. Another study showed that a previous hamstring injury is one of the most cited risks for future injury, with as many as one-third of active individuals experiencing a re-injury within 2 weeks of returning to activity. A meta-analysis article showed evidence that a history of hamstring injury and being of older age were associated with increased risk of hamstring strains. One study found that men and master athletes (athletes older than forty) were at an increased risk of hamstring strains compared with women and younger athletes. Women were approximately 3 times more likely to develop hamstring strain than males with the majority of these being non-sporting scenarios. Similarly the average age of non-sporting hamstring strains are from the ages of 40 to 60. Many of these non-sporting injuries are sustained during road traffic accidents, slipping, and falling. These results also show that hamstring strains account for 50% of muscle injuries received by sprinters and are the most common injury in hurdling. One explanation is that older active individuals may be at greater risk due to lower levels of eccentric knee flexor strength compared with their younger counterparts. However, it is unclear whether flexibility serves as a risk factor; this topic should be researched in the future to further understand the relationship between flexibility and risk of injury. Muscle weakness has also been an implication as a predisposing factor for both primary and recurring hamstring strain injuries. Over a 10-year study more than 51.3% of hamstring strains occurred during the preseason of athletics. In another study, that analyzed 25 NCAA sports over four years, it was clearly shown that hamstring strain rates are higher in the preseason. The factors that are being implicated in this trend are the relative deterioration and muscle weakness that occur during the off-season.

The hamstrings undergo a complex dynamic process during gait, making it unsurprising that they are frequently injured. They must first contract concentrically during the end of the stance phase in order to bend the knee and allow the foot (along with dorsiflexion at the ankle) to clear the ground. At the end of the swing phase, the hamstrings must eccentrically contract while applying a braking moment to knee extension, then immediately change functions to again concentrically contract and produce hip extension. Studies have shown that "the hamstring group reaches peak elongation and acts eccentrically at the hip and knee during the late swing phases of running" and that "the hamstrings are most active and develop the greatest torques at the hip and knee during the late swing through midstance phase of running." Thus, the hamstrings reach their maximum length while attempting to forcefully contract eccentrically and switch functions to immediately produce a concentric contraction, which makes the terminal part of swing phase the most vulnerable for injury.

There have been many other proposed predisposing factors to injury. These include muscle weakness, muscle imbalance, poor flexibility, fatigue, inadequate warm up, poor neuromuscular control, and poor running technique. One of the few predisposing factors that most researchers agree upon however is previous hamstring injury. Brokett et al. (2004) stated that "the athletes most at risk of a hamstring strain are those with a previous history of such injury" and noted that 34% of the hamstring injuries were recurrences." Cameron et al. also found that 34% of injuries recur in the same season. Arnason et al. generalized these numbers, saying that previous injury was in itself an independent risk factor for re-injury.

When examining sprint related activities, strengthening programs should target exercises associated with horizontal force production and high levels of hamstring activity. When analyzing correlations between exercises like the Upright-hip-extension and the Nordic hamstring curl without hip flexion, a demonstration of no more than an average of 60% hamstring activation was measured. This is less stress than is seen in maximal sprinting. Sprint related activities like the A-Switch, A-Skip, Bounding, dribbles, etc., progressed to maximal sprinting display better physical preparation and specificity. This is conjunction with isometric variations like the hamstring iso-hold, iso-switch, iso-catch, along with the Upright-hip-extension and Nordic hamstring without hip flexion compliment as strength exercises. Typical return to play protocols for hamstring strain for sprint demands must include the sprint related activities above progressing to qualities like acceleration, late acceleration, maximum velocity, and speed endurance for effective rehabilitation and preparation for sport demands. Thus exercises like the Upright-Hip-Extension and Nordic Hamstring Curl without Hip Flexion in isolation will not adequately prepare for sport related activities.
