= Roman Anthony =

American baseball player (born 2004)

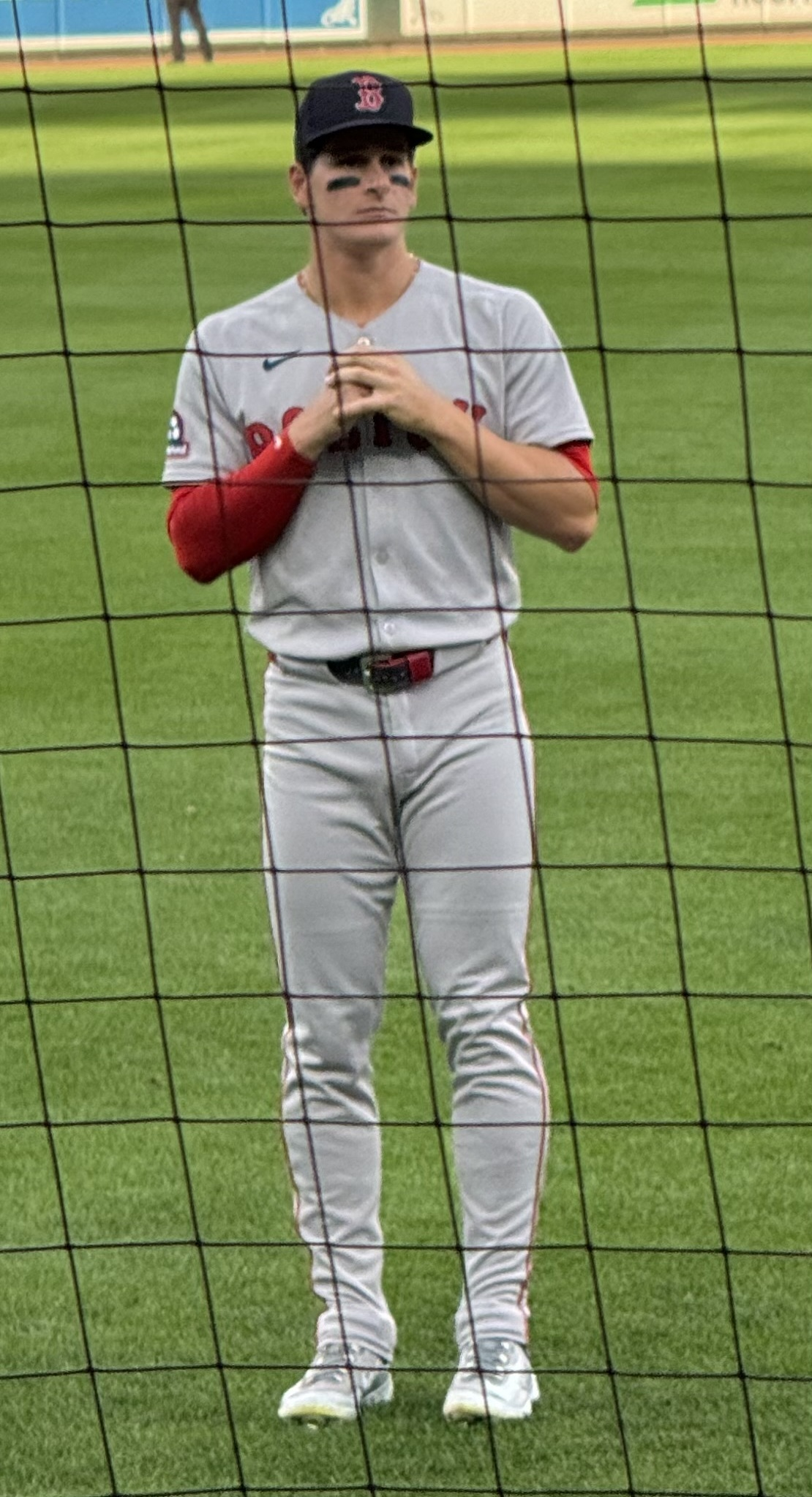
- Anthony with the Boston Red Sox in 2025

Boston Red Sox – No. 19
- Outfielder
- Born: May 13, 2004 (age 22); West Palm Beach, Florida, U.S.
- Bats: Left Throws: Right

MLB debut
- June 9, 2025, for the Boston Red Sox

MLB statistics (through 2026 season)
- Batting average: .271
- Home runs: 13
- Runs batted in: 47
- Stats at Baseball Reference

Teams
- Boston Red Sox (2025–present)
Medals
Men's baseball
Representing United States
World Baseball Classic
Silver medal – second place	2026 Miami	Team

Roman Joseph Anthony (born May 13, 2004) is an American professional baseball outfielder for the Boston Red Sox of Major League Baseball (MLB). He made his MLB debut in 2025 after being widely recognized as baseball's top prospect.

== Amateur career ==
Anthony attended Marjory Stoneman Douglas High School in Parkland, Florida. He committed to play college baseball at Ole Miss after his sophomore year. He was named the Broward County 7-A Player of the Year by the Sun Sentinel after hitting for a .363 batting average with five home runs, six doubles, and 22 runs batted in (RBIs) with 26 stolen bases and 32 runs scored. As a senior, Anthony batted .520 with 52 hits, 14 doubles, 10 home runs, 40 RBIs, and 36 runs scored and repeated as the Broward 7-A Player of the Year. He was also named the Gatorade Florida Player of the Year and Florida Mr. Baseball. Early in the season, Anthony had seven hits in 15 at bats with four stolen bases in the National High School Invitational, which his team won.

== Professional career ==
=== Boston Red Sox ===
==== 2022–2024: Draft and Minor leagues ====
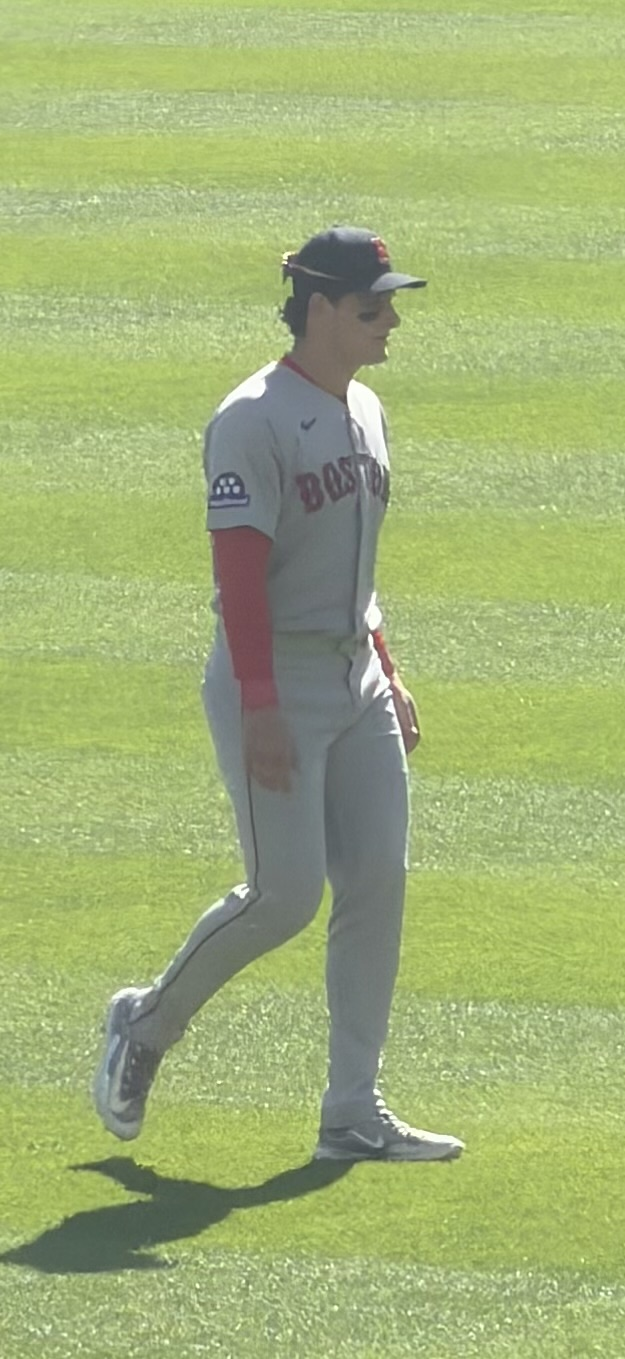
Roman Anthony in March 2026

Anthony was considered a top prospect for the 2022 MLB draft and was selected 79th overall by the Boston Red Sox. He signed with the team and received an over-slot signing bonus of $2.5 million. After signing, Anthony was assigned to the Rookie-level Florida Complex League Red Sox to begin his professional career. He was promoted in late August to the Salem Red Sox of the Single-A Carolina League.

Anthony returned to Salem at the beginning of the 2023 season. He batted .228 with one home run and 18 RBI in 42 games played with Salem and was promoted to the High-A Greenville Drive. Anthony was promoted a second time to the Double-A Portland Sea Dogs after hitting .294 with 12 home runs, 38 RBI, and 41 runs scored in 54 games played with Greenville. He finished the season with a .272 batting average and 14 home runs with 64 RBIs and 78 runs scored. Anthony was recognized as the Red Sox' minor league hitter of the year for 2023.

Anthony began the 2024 season with Portland, ranked as the Red Sox' number two minor-league prospect by Baseball America. In August, he was promoted to the Triple-A Worcester Red Sox, along with fellow-prospects Marcelo Mayer and Kyle Teel. At the time of his promotion, Anthony had posted a .269/.367/.489 slash line with Portland. In September, Anthony was named the top prospect in baseball by Baseball America, replacing Junior Caminero due to the latter's time in the majors.

==== 2025: MLB rookie season ====
The Red Sox invited Anthony to 2025 spring training. He was assigned to Worcester to begin the season, slashing .288/.423/.491 with 10 home runs and 29 RBI. On June 7, Anthony belted a 497-foot grand slam against the Rochester Red Wings, which was the longest home run in professional baseball to that point in the year. On June 9, Anthony made his major-league debut for Boston, going hitless in four at-bats with an RBI groundout against the Tampa Bay Rays. At age 21 years and 27 days, Anthony was the youngest Red Sox player to make his debut since Rafael Devers, who debuted at age 20 years and 274 days. On June 10, Anthony's uniform number was changed from 48 to 19. The same day, Anthony recorded his first MLB hit, a two-RBI double in the first inning off of Rays pitcher Ryan Pepiot. Anthony's first career home run with the Red Sox was on June 16, against the Seattle Mariners. Anthony's first walk-off hit came on August 1, against the Houston Astros.

On August 6, Anthony signed an eight-year contract extension worth $130 million, with significant escalators that could result in a contract worth upwards of $230 million. The deal includes a club option and keeps Anthony under club control through 2034. Anthony was named the American League (AL) Rookie of the Month for August after hitting .304 with six homers, 13 RBI, four doubles, 15 walks, 21 runs scored, two stolen bases, a .520 slugging percentage and a .390 on-base percentage in 26 games. On September 3, the team placed him on the 10-day injured list with a left oblique strain, sidelining him for the remainder of the regular season.

Anthony was a finalist for the AL Rookie of the Year Award. He finished third in voting. If he had finished first or second, he would have earned several million dollars in escalators on his contract extension. He was named to MLB's 2025 All-Rookie team as an outfielder.

==== 2026 ====
In 2026, Anthony made his first Opening Day roster and was named the Red Sox leadoff hitter. On May 4, in a game against the Detroit Tigers at Comerica Park, Anthony suffered an injury during an awkward check-swing in his first at bat of the game. Initially thought to be a wrist sprain, it was later confirmed that Anthony had a partially torn right ring finger CMC ligament. On May 7, he was placed on the 10-day injured list, but was later transferred to the 60-day injured list on June 28 with the Red Sox sending Anthony to Fort Myers, Florida (the team's Spring Training home) to rehab and visit a hand injury specialist. He would spend over three months on the injured list, before starting a rehab assignment with Double-A Portland. In his first rehab game, he hit a two run home run that cleared the ballpark and landed in neighboring Fitzpatrick Stadium. On August 30, Anthony was activated off of the injured list.

== International career ==
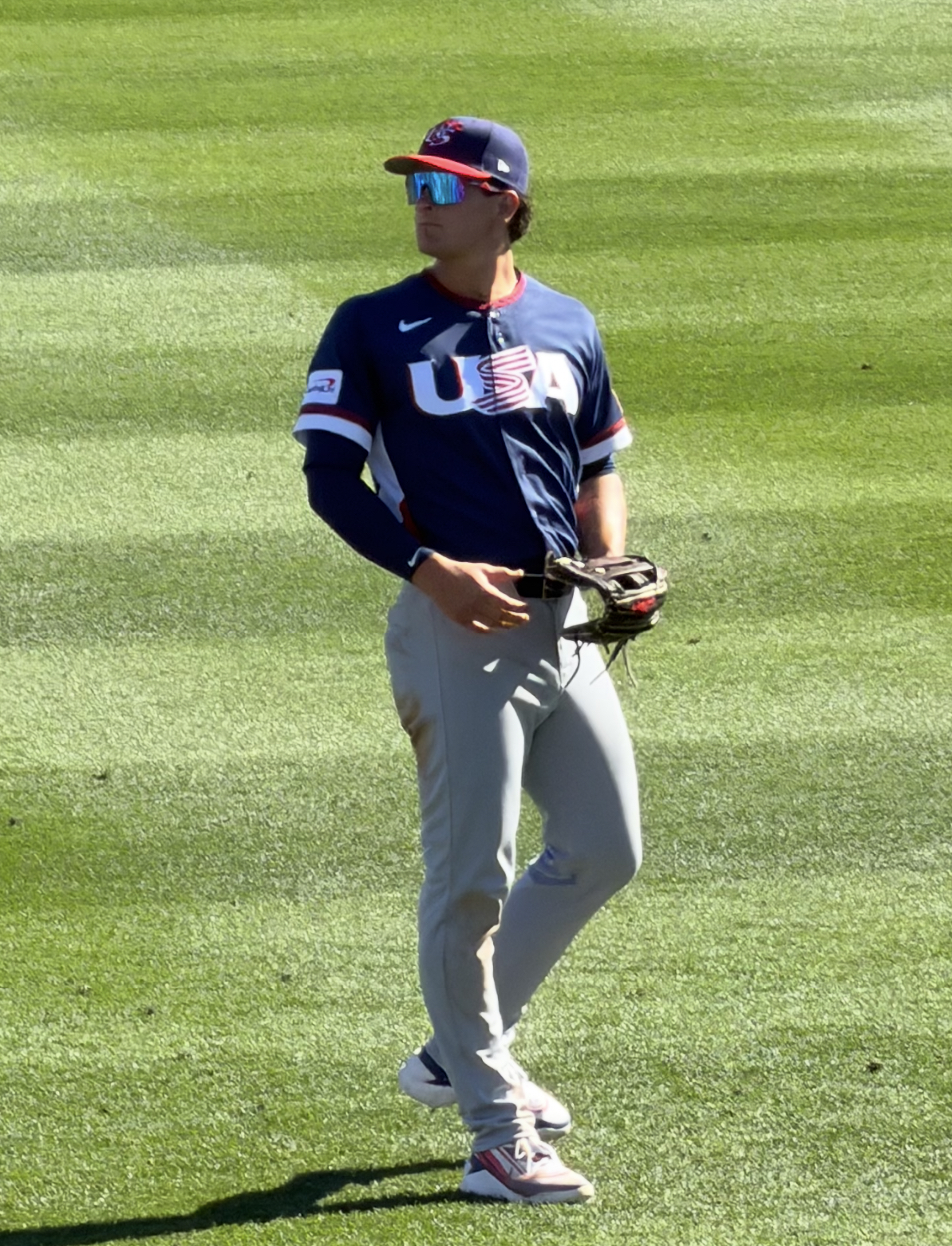
Roman Anthony with Team USA March 2026

On February 16, 2026, it was announced that Anthony would represent the United States in the 2026 World Baseball Classic. Throughout the tournament, he slashed .280/.400/.520 , with a .920 OPS and two home runs over 30 plate appearances. During a semifinal game against the Dominican Republic, Roman hit a game winning home run. At 21 years old, Anthony is the youngest player to hit a homerun during the semifinal or final rounds during the World Baseball Classic. The United States would end up falling to Venezuela in the finals. After the tournament, Anthony was named to the 2026 All-WBC team as one of three outfielders.

== Personal life ==
Anthony grew up attending Miami Marlins games and credits Christian Yelich as his favorite player.

Anthony was raised in Southern Florida and has Italian roots from both of his parents. His father and brother are both named Anthony Anthony. Along with his mother (Lori) and sister (Lia), the family went viral while sitting in attendance at Fenway Park for Anthony's first big league hit.

Awards
Preceded by Nick Kurtz	American League Rookie of the Month; August 2025	Succeeded by Joey Cantillo
