= Compression therapy =

Compression therapy may refer to:

- Attachment therapy, a loosely identified category of mental health interventions.
- Cold compression therapy, to reduce pain and swelling from a sports or activity injury.
