= Crush syndrome =

Shock and kidney failure due to crushing of skeletal muscle

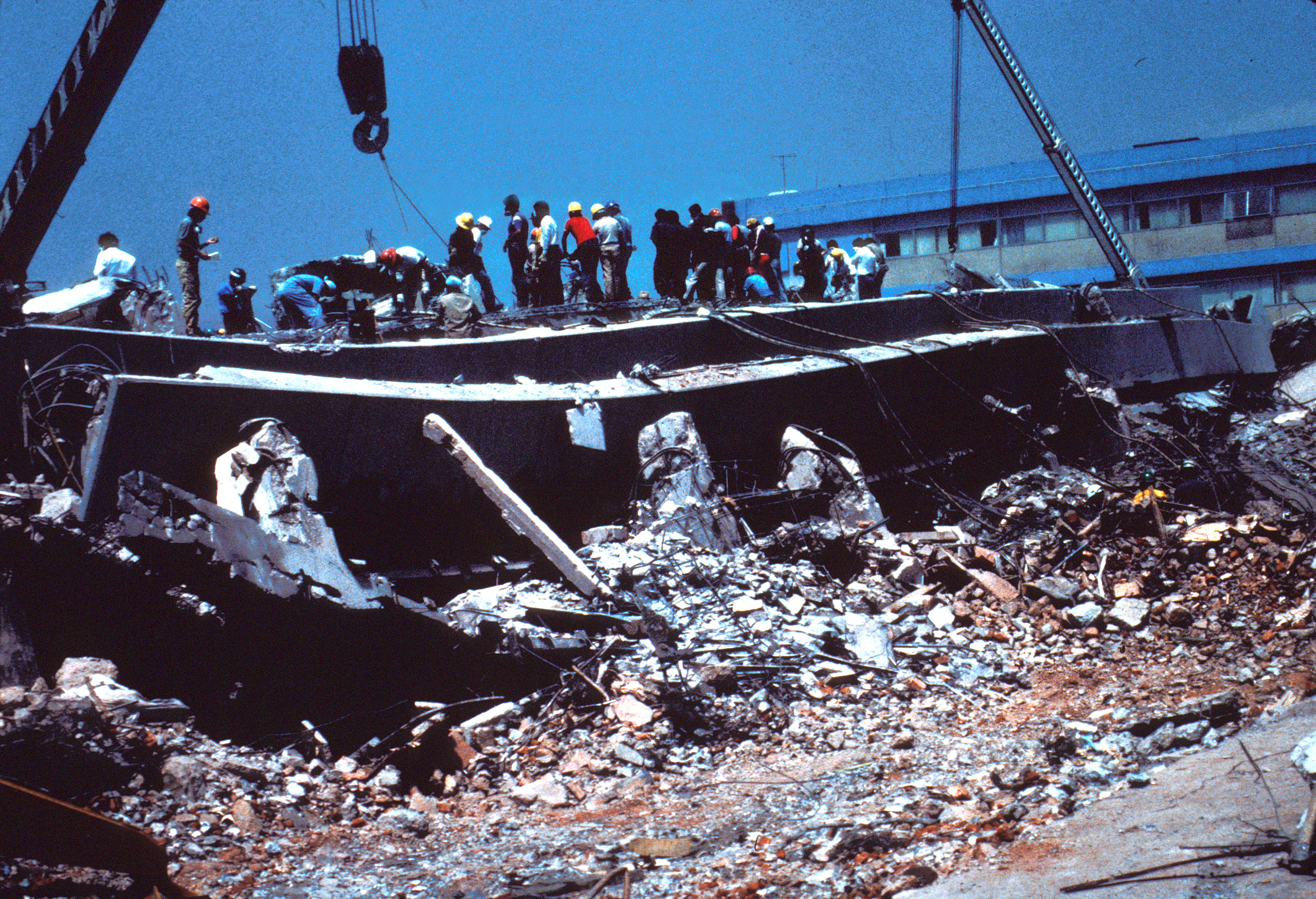
- Collapsed building from 1985 Mexico earthquake. Earthquakes are a main cause of crush syndrome injuries.
- Specialty: Emergency medicine
- Complications: Kidney failure
- Causes: Serious-extreme contusion

Crush syndrome (also traumatic rhabdomyolysis, Bywaters' syndrome, or smiling death) is a medical condition characterized by major shock and kidney failure after a crushing injury to skeletal muscle. Not to be confused with crush injury, which is the compression of the arms, legs, or other parts of the body that causes muscle swelling and/or neurological disturbances in the affected areas of the body, while crush syndrome is a localized crush injury with systemic manifestations. Cases occur commonly in catastrophes such as earthquakes, to individuals who have been trapped under fallen or moving masonry.

People with crushing damage present some of the greatest challenges in field medicine, and may need a physician's attention on the site of their injury. Appropriate physiological preparation of the injured is mandatory. It may be possible to free the patient without amputation; however, field amputations may be necessary in drastic situations.

== Pathophysiology ==
Seigo Minami, a Japanese physician, first reported the crush syndrome in 1923. He studied the pathology of three soldiers who died in World War I due to kidney failure. The renal changes were due to the buildup of excess myoglobin, resulting from the destruction of muscles from lack of oxygen. The progressive acute kidney failure is because of acute tubular necrosis.

The syndrome was later described by British physician Eric Bywaters in patients during the 1941 wartime bombing of London (the Blitz). It is a reperfusion injury that appears after the release of the crushing pressure. The mechanism is believed to be the release into the bloodstream of muscle breakdown products—notably myoglobin, potassium and phosphorus—that are the products of rhabdomyolysis (the breakdown of skeletal muscle damaged by ischemic conditions).

The specific action on the kidneys is not understood completely, but may be due partly to nephrotoxic metabolites of myoglobin.

The most devastating effects upon the body can occur when the crushing pressure is suddenly released, without proper preparation of the patient, causing reperfusion syndrome. In addition to tissue directly suffering the crush mechanism, the tissue is then subjected to sudden reoxygenation in the limbs and extremities. Without proper preparation, the patient, with pain control, may be cheerful before recovery, but then may suddenly die shortly thereafter. This sudden failure is called the "smiling death".

These systemic effects are caused by a traumatic rhabdomyolysis. As muscle cells die, they absorb sodium, water, and calcium; the rhabdomyolysis releases potassium, myoglobin, phosphate, thromboplastin, creatine, and creatine kinase.

Crush syndrome can directly come from compartment syndrome, if the injury is left untreated. Symptoms include the 5Ps i.e. pain, pallor, paresthesias ("pins and needles"), paralysis, and pulselessness.

== Treatment ==
There is no distinct treatment option that can undo the effects and damage from rhabdomyolysis because it is a type of necrosis, where the tissue and body cells die prematurely. However, the rate of the pathology that can lead to more complications can be decreased by acting early and consistently. Overall treatment depends on preventing kidney failure (renal failure) which is done by rehydrating the patient. It also depends on making urine have a more basic pH (alkalinization of urine).

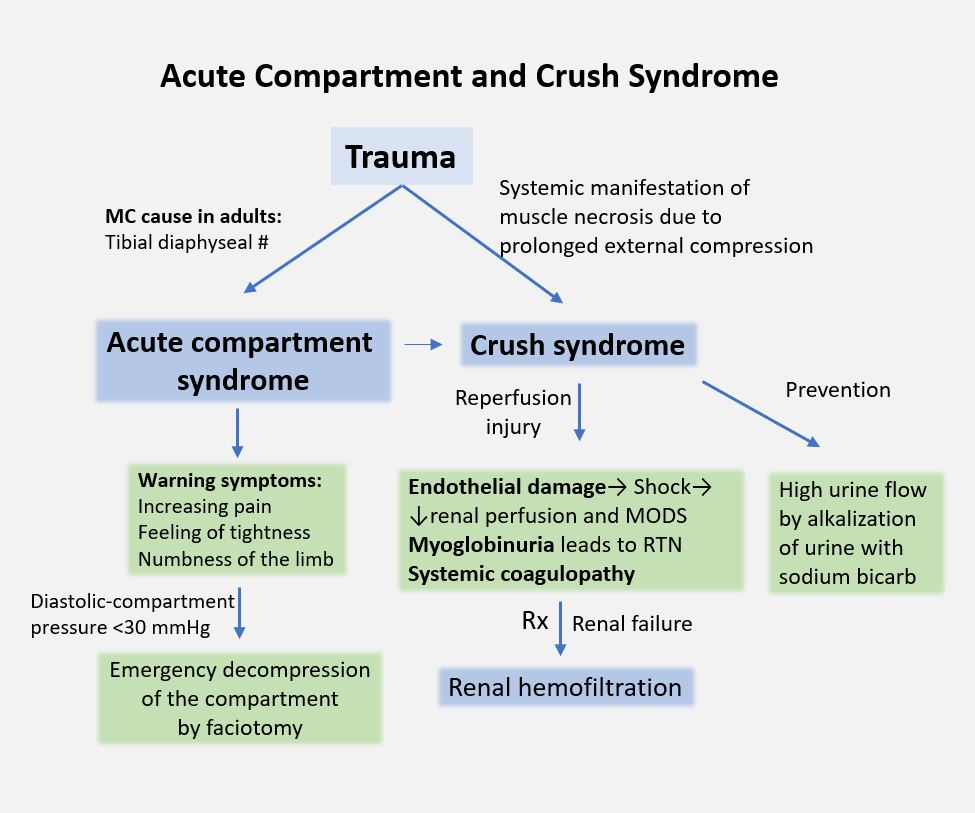
Crush syndrome progression. (Glossary: MC = most common, # = fracture, MODS = multiple organ dysfunction syndrome, RTN = renal tubular necrosis.)

Immediate untreated crush syndrome death is caused by severe head injury, torso injury with damaged abdominal organs, and asphyxia (excessive loss of oxygen). Early untreated crush syndrome death is caused by hyperkalemia and by hypovolemic shock. Late untreated crush syndrome death is caused by renal failure, coagulopathy and hemorrhage, and sepsis.

Due to the risk of crush syndrome, current recommendation to nonprofessional first-aiders (in the UK) is to not release those with a crush injury who have been trapped for more than 15 minutes. A torniquet may be used in the event that treatment is not immediately available, as it traps toxins in the ischemic limb, but it is only a method of postponing medical attention. Upon release, isotonic saline is used for fluid resuscitation.

=== Field management ===
As mentioned, permissive hypotension (restrictive fluid therapy) is unwise. Careful fluid overload and administration of intravenous sodium bicarbonate is wise, especially if the crushing weight is on the patient for more than four hours, but often if it persists more than one hour. The San Francisco emergency services protocol calls for a basic adult dose of a 2 L bolus of normal saline followed by 500 mL/h, limited for "pediatric patients and patients with history of cardiac or renal dysfunction".

Use of a tourniquet can stall the life-threatening consequences of a crush related injury and can be a second option if the person cannot immediately have the fluids that were lost be medically replaced back into the body. Tourniquet measures should be taken if the person has been trapped for more than two hours.

=== Initial hospital management ===
The clinician must protect the patient against hypotension, kidney failure, acidosis, hyperkalemia and hypocalcemia. Admission to an intensive care unit, preferably one experienced in trauma medicine, may be appropriate; even well-seeming patients need observation. Open wounds should be treated as surgically appropriate, with debridement, antibiotics and tetanus toxoid; ice should be applied to injured areas. Breathing and circulation must be checked and the patient should be given oxygen if eligible. Oral or intravenous fluids must be given depending on the measured amounts of electrolytes, arterial blood gases, and muscle enzymes.

Intravenous hydration of up to 1.5 L/h should continue to prevent hypotension. A urinary output of at least 300 mL/h should be maintained with IV fluids and mannitol, and hemodialysis considered if an increase in urine is not achieved. Intravenous sodium bicarbonate should be used to keep the urine pH at 6.5 or greater, to prevent myoglobin and uric acid deposition in kidneys.

To prevent hyperkalemia/hypocalcemia, consider the following adult doses:

- calcium gluconate 10% 10 mL or calcium chloride 10% 5 mL IV over 2 minutes
- sodium bicarbonate 1 meq/kg IV slow push
- regular insulin 5–10 U
- 50% glucose 1–2 ampules IV bolus
- kayexalate 25–50 g with sorbitol 20% 100 mL by mouth or rectum.

Even so, abnormal heart rhythms may develop; electrocardiographic monitoring is advised, and specific treatment should be begun promptly.
