= Kissing contusion =

Contusions of both surfaces of the knee joint are known as kissing contusions. These contusions are generally found by magnetic resonance imaging and most cases are associated with ligamentous or meniscal injuries.
