= Bruise =

Type of localized bleeding in tissues outside blood vessels

- Other names: Contusion, ecchymosis
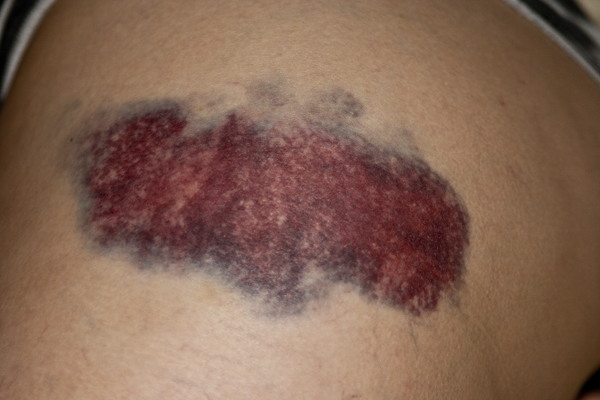
- Bruise on upper leg caused by a blunt object
- Specialty: Emergency medicine
- Treatment: RICE (rest, ice, compression, and elevation); CT scan (for further examination if a serious bruise had a potential warning sign of crush syndrome which accompanied with bone fractures after earthquakes, work accidents, traffic accidents, hit by collapsing trees during tropical cyclones); Certain surgeries (if a serious-extreme bruise caused crush syndrome which accompanied with bone fractures after earthquakes, work accidents, traffic accidents, hit by collapsing trees during tropical cyclones)

A bruise, also known as a contusion, is a type of hematoma of tissue, the most common cause being capillaries damaged by trauma, causing localized bleeding that extravasates into the surrounding interstitial tissues. Most bruises occur close enough to the epidermis such that the bleeding causes a visible discoloration. The bruise then remains visible until the blood is either absorbed by tissues or cleared by immune system action. Bruises which do not blanch under pressure can involve capillaries at the level of skin, subcutaneous tissue, muscle, or bone.

Bruises are not to be confused with other similar-looking lesions. Such lesions include petechia (less than 3 mm (0.12 in), resulting from numerous and diverse etiologies such as adverse reactions from medications such as warfarin, straining, asphyxiation, platelet disorders and diseases such as cytomegalovirus); and purpura (3–10 mm (0.12–0.39 in)), classified as palpable purpura or non-palpable purpura and indicating various pathologic conditions such as thrombocytopenia. Additionally, although many terminology schemas treat an ecchymosis (plural, ecchymoses) (over 1 cm (0.39 in)) as synonymous with a bruise, in some other schemas, an ecchymosis is differentiated by its remoteness from the source and cause of bleeding, with blood dissecting through tissue planes and settling in an area remote from the site of trauma or even nontraumatic pathology, such as in periorbital ecchymosis ("raccoon eyes"), arising from a basilar skull fracture or from a neuroblastoma.

As a type of hematoma, a bruise is always caused by internal bleeding into the interstitial tissues which does not break through the skin, usually initiated by blunt trauma, which causes damage through physical compression and deceleration forces. Trauma sufficient to cause bruising can occur from a wide variety of situations including accidents, falls, and surgeries. Disease states such as insufficient or malfunctioning platelets, other coagulation deficiencies, or vascular disorders, such as venous blockage associated with severe allergies can lead to the formation of purpura which is not to be confused with trauma-related bruising/contusion. If the trauma is sufficient to break the skin and allow blood to escape the interstitial tissues, the injury is not a bruise but bleeding, a different variety of hemorrhage. Such injuries may be accompanied by bruising elsewhere.

== Signs and symptoms ==
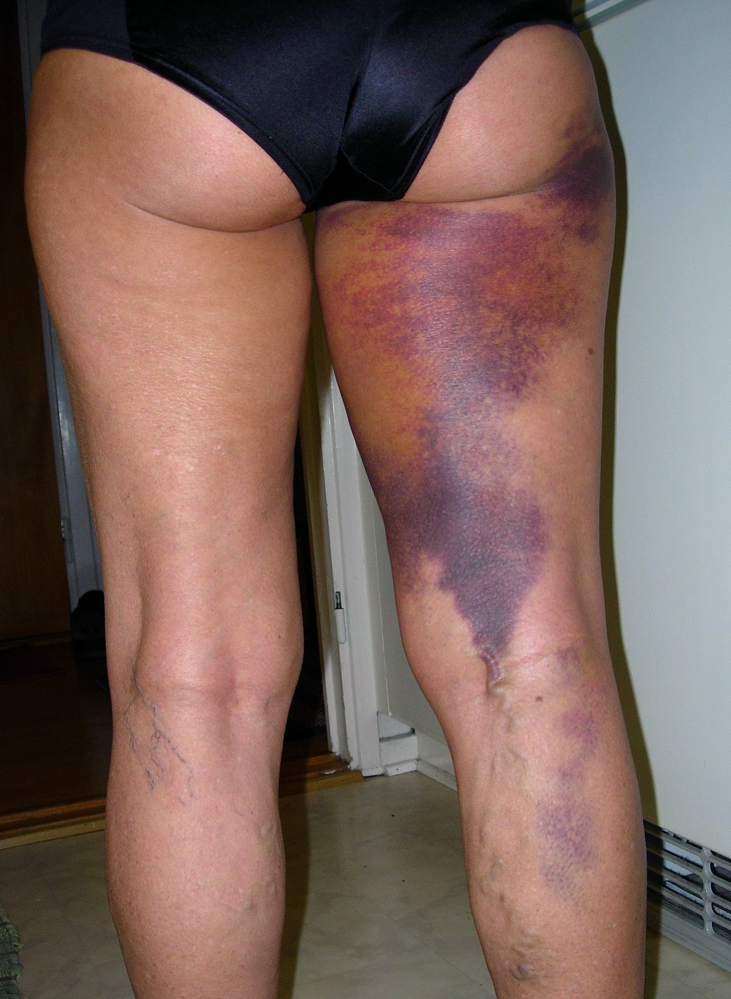
A woman's bruising after a severe fall

Bruises often induce pain immediately after the trauma that results in their formation, but small bruises are not normally dangerous alone. Sometimes bruises can be serious, leading to other more life-threatening forms of hematoma, such as when associated with serious injuries, including fractures and more severe internal bleeding. The likelihood and severity of bruising depends on many factors, including type and healthiness of affected tissues. Minor bruises may be easily recognized in people with light skin color by characteristic blue or purple appearance (idiomatically described as "black and blue") in the days following the injury.

Hematomas can be subdivided by size. By definition, ecchymoses are 1 centimetres in size or larger, and are therefore larger than petechiae (less than 3 millimetres in diameter) or purpura (3 to 10 millimetres in diameter). Ecchymoses also have a more diffuse border than other purpura. A broader definition of ecchymosis is the escape of blood into the tissues from ruptured blood vessels. The term also applies to the subcutaneous discoloration resulting from seepage of blood within the injured tissue.

Bruise colors vary from red, blue, or almost black, depending on the severity of broken capillaries or blood vessels within the bruise site. Broken venules or arterioles often result in a deep blue or dark red bruise, respectively. Darker colored bruises may result from a more severe bleeding from both blood vessels. Older bruises may appear yellow, green or brown.

== Cause ==
There are many causes of subcutaneous hematomas including ecchymoses. Coagulopathies such as hemophilia A may cause ecchymosis formation in children. The medication betamethasone can have the adverse effect of causing ecchymosis.

The presence of bruises may be seen in patients with platelet or coagulation disorders, or those who are being treated with an anticoagulant. Unexplained bruising may be a warning sign of child abuse, domestic abuse, hard blows during fighting sports, or serious medical problems such as leukemia or meningococcal infection. Unexplained bruising can also indicate internal bleeding or certain types of cancer. Long-term glucocorticoid therapy can cause easy bruising. Bruising present around the navel (belly button) with severe abdominal pain suggests acute pancreatitis. Connective tissue disorders such as Ehlers–Danlos syndrome may cause relatively easy or spontaneous bruising depending on the severity. Spontaneous bruising or bruising with minimal trauma in the absence of other explanations and together with other minor or major criteria suggestive of vascular Ehlers–Danlos Syndrome (vEDS) suggests genetic testing for the condition.

During an autopsy, bruises accompanying abrasions indicate the abrasions occurred while the individual was alive, as opposed to damage incurred post mortem.

=== Size and shape ===
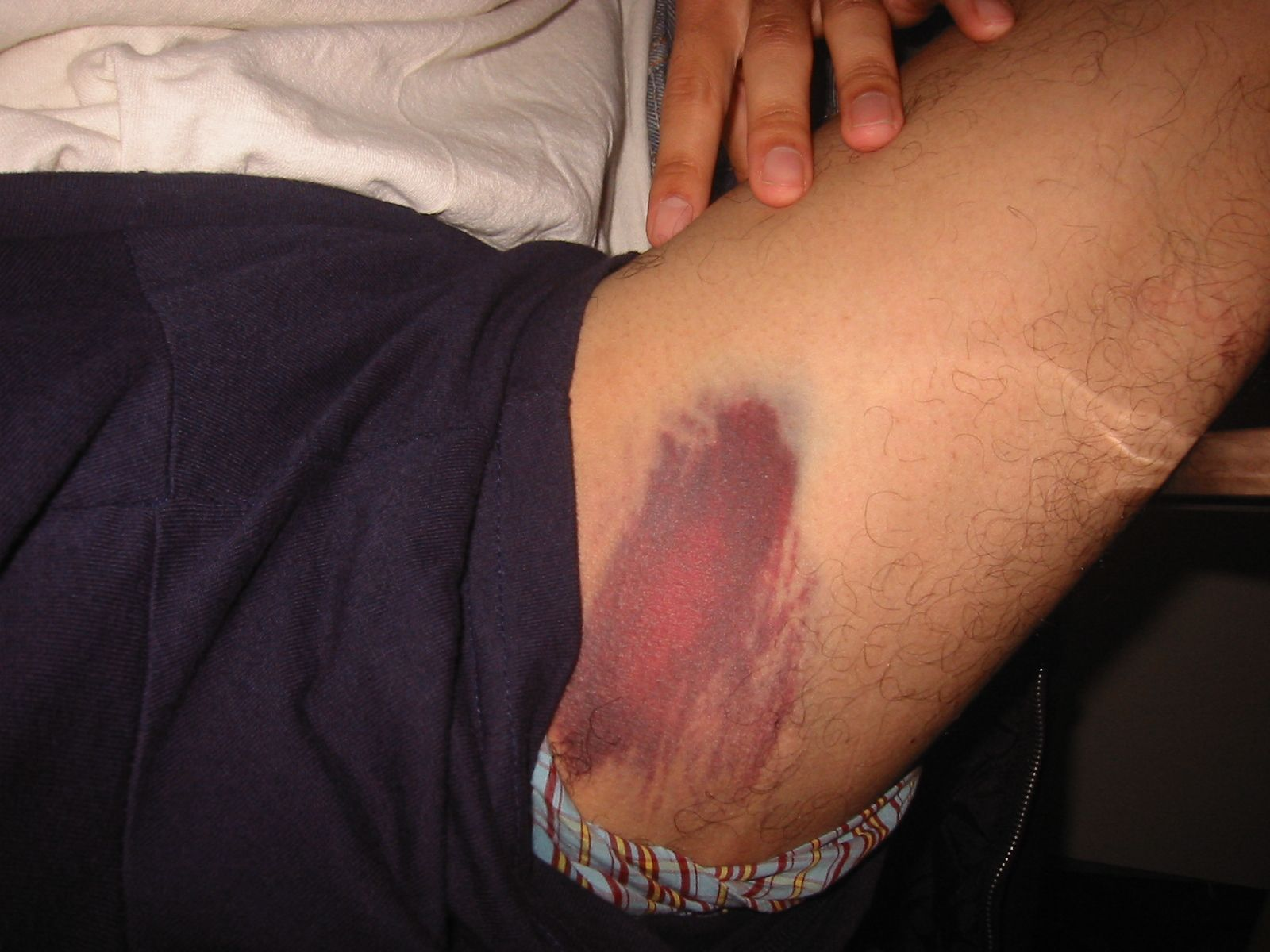
Bruise caused by colliding with a handrail, typical of extreme sports such as skateboarding and rollerblading.

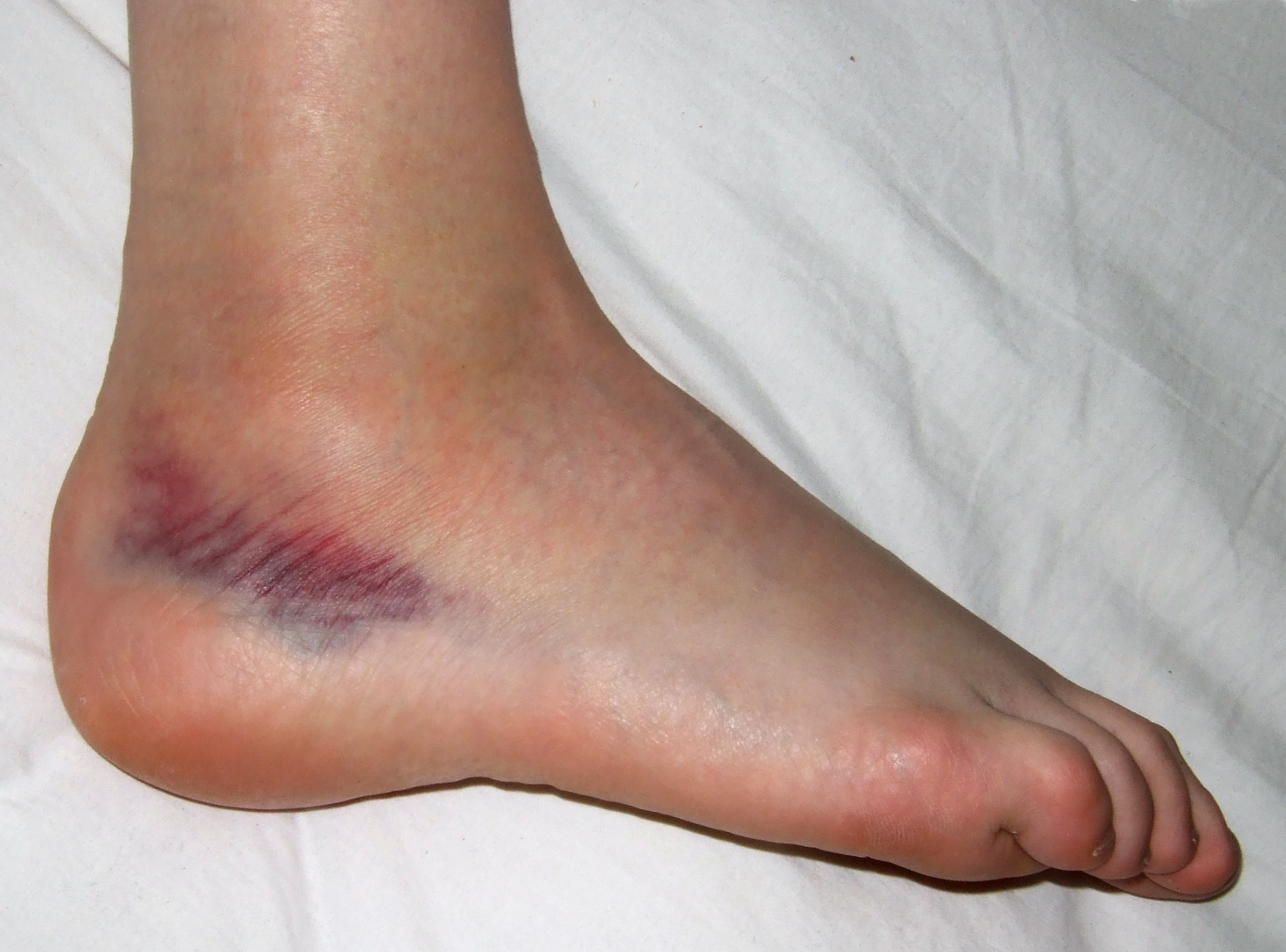
Bruise caused by a sprained ankle

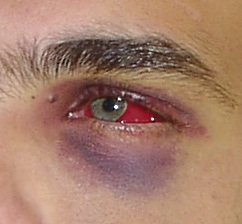
Black eye and subconjunctival hemorrhage after a punch to the face

Bruise shapes may correspond directly to the instrument of injury or be modified by additional factors. Bruises often become more prominent as time lapses, resulting in additional size and swelling, and may grow to a large size over the course of the hours after the injury that caused the bruise was inflicted.

- Condition and type of tissue: In soft tissues, a larger area is bruised than would be in firmer tissue due to ease of blood to invade tissue.
- Age: Elderly skin and tissue is often thinner and less elastic, and thus more prone to bruising.
- Gender: More bruising occurs in females due to increased subcutaneous fat.
- Skin tone: Discoloration caused by bruises is more prominent in lighter complexions.
- Diseases: Coagulation, platelet and blood vessel diseases or deficiencies can increase bruising due to more bleeding.
- Location: More extensive vascularity causes more bleeding. Areas such as the arms, knees, shins and the facial area are especially common bruise sites.
- Forces: Greater striking forces cause greater bruising.
- Genes: Despite having completely normal coagulation factors, natural redheads have been shown to bruise more, although this may just be due to greater visibility on commonly associated lighter complexion.

=== Severity ===
Bruises can be scored on a scale from 0–5 to categorize the severity and danger of the injury.

Bruise harm score
Harm score	Severity level	Notes
0	Light bruise	No damage
1	Mild bruise	Little damages.
2	Moderate bruise	Some damages. Need early medical consultation at hospitals.
3	Serious bruise	Dangerous. Might be a potential warning sign of crush syndrome and often accompanied with bone fractures.
4	Extremely serious bruise	Very dangerous. Crush syndrome occurs and often accompanied with bone fractures.
5	Critical bruise	Risk of death (livor mortis).

The harm score is determined by the extent and severity of the injuries to the organs and tissues causing the bruising, in turn depending on multiple factors. For example, a contracted muscle will bruise more severely, as will tissues crushed against underlying bone. Capillaries vary in strength, stiffness and toughness, which can also vary by age and medical conditions.

Low levels of impact can produce small bruises that normally heal within two weeks, although duration may be affected by individual healing processes; generally, more severe or deeper bruises take somewhat longer.

Severe bruising (harm score 2–3) may be dangerous or cause serious complications. Further bleeding and excess fluid may accumulate causing a hard, fluctuating lump or swelling hematoma. This has the potential to cause compartment syndrome in which the swelling cuts off blood flow to the tissues. The trauma that induced the bruise may also have caused other severe and potentially fatal harm to internal organs. For example, impacts to the head can cause traumatic brain injury: bleeding, bruising and massive swelling of the brain with the potential to cause concussion, coma and death. Treatment for brain bruising may involve emergency surgery to relieve the pressure on the brain.

Damage that causes bruising can also cause bones to be broken, tendons or muscles to be strained, ligaments to be sprained, or other tissue to be damaged. The symptoms and signs of these injuries may initially appear to be those of simple bruising. Abdominal bruising that triggers Crush syndrome after earthquakes, work accidents, traffic accidents, hit by collapsing trees during tropical cyclones that cause difficulty in moving a limb or the feeling 5Ps i.e. pain, pallor, paresthesia ("pins and needles"), paralysis, and pulselessness) may indicate life-threatening injury and require the attention of a physician.

== Mechanism ==
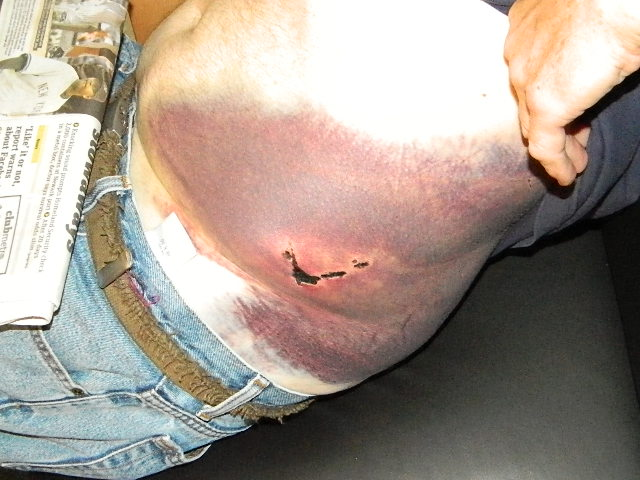
Severe bruising resulting from work accidents. and might be a potential warning sign of crush syndrome, rhabdomyolysis, myoglobinuria.

Increased distress to tissue causes capillaries to break under the skin, allowing blood to escape and build up. As time progresses, blood seeps into the surrounding tissues, causing the bruise to darken and spread. Nerve endings within the affected tissue detect the increased pressure, which, depending on severity and location, may be perceived as pain or pressure or be asymptomatic. The damaged capillary endothelium releases endothelin, a hormone that causes narrowing of the blood vessel to minimize bleeding. As the endothelium is destroyed, the underlying von Willebrand factor is exposed and initiates coagulation, which creates a temporary clot to plug the wound and eventually leads to restoration of normal tissue.

During this time, larger bruises may change color due to the breakdown of hemoglobin from within escaped red blood cells in the extracellular space. The striking colors of a bruise are caused by the phagocytosis and sequential degradation of hemoglobin to biliverdin to bilirubin to hemosiderin, with hemoglobin itself producing a red-blue color, biliverdin producing a green color, bilirubin producing a yellow color, and hemosiderin producing a golden-brown color. As these products are cleared from the area, the bruise disappears. Often the underlying tissue damage has been repaired long before this process is complete.

== Treatment ==
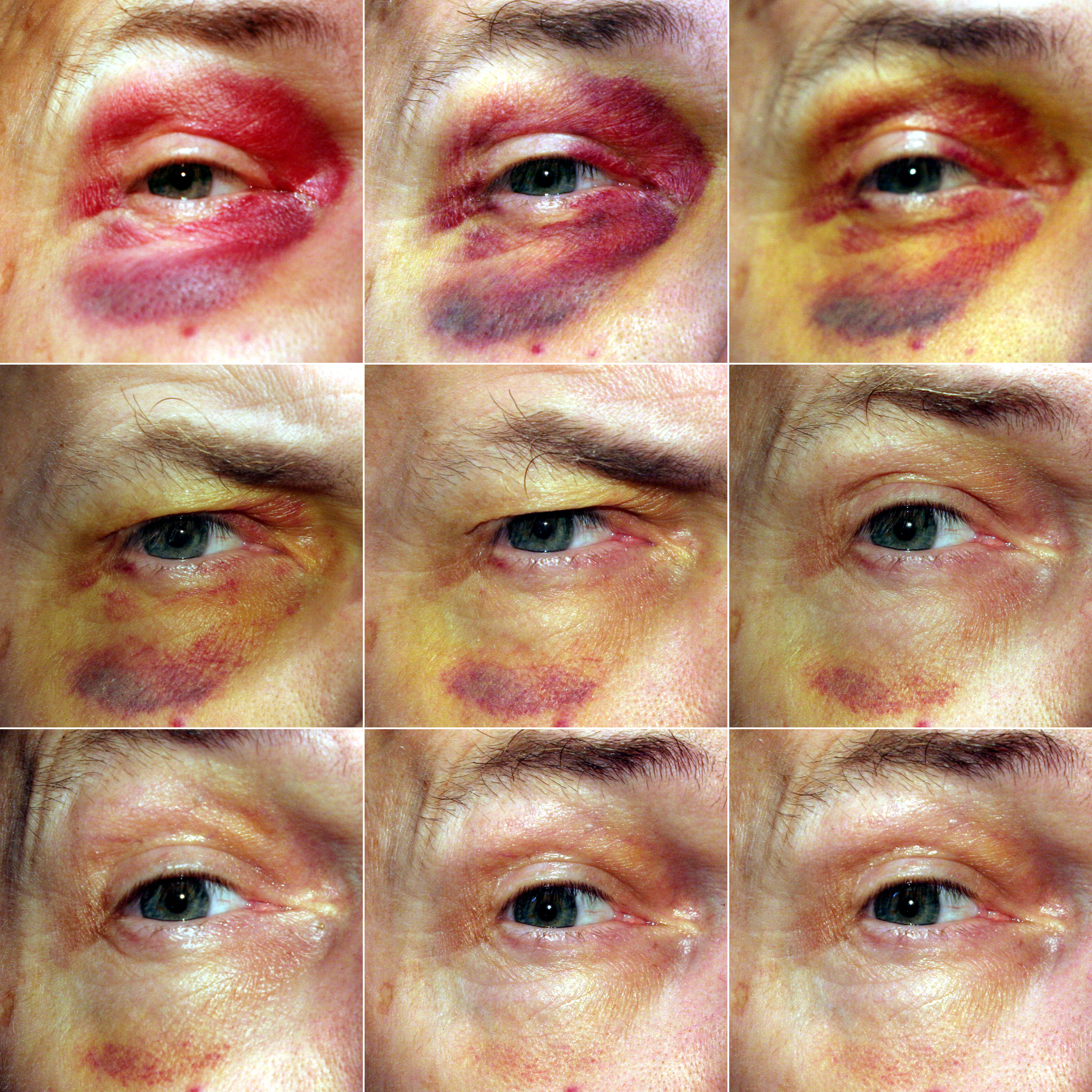
Healing of a black eye over a nine-day period caused by a wisdom tooth extraction

Treatment for mild bruises is minimal and may include RICE (rest, ice, compression, and elevation), painkillers (particularly NSAIDs) and, later in recovery, light stretching exercises. Particularly, immediate application of ice while elevating the area may reduce or completely prevent swelling by restricting blood flow to the area and preventing internal bleeding. Rest and preventing re-injury is essential for rapid recovery.

Very gently massaging the area and applying heat may encourage blood flow and relieve pain according to the gate control theory of pain, although causing additional pain may indicate the massage is exacerbating the injury. As for most injuries, these techniques should not be applied until at least three days following the initial damage to ensure all internal bleeding has stopped, because although increasing blood flow will allow more healing factors into the area and encourage drainage, if the injury is still bleeding this will allow more blood to seep out of the wound and cause the bruise to become worse.

Treatment for serious-extreme bruises is highly different and complicated from mild bruises because had a potential warning sign of crush syndrome which accompanied with bone fractures and later followed by rhabdomyolysis after earthquakes, work accidents, traffic accidents, hit by collapsing trees during tropical cyclones. For the victims of earthquakes, work accidents, traffic accidents with serious-extreme bruises — civilians whose acted as bystanders (not civilian humanitarian volunteers) must call firefighters/search-and-rescue teams first for non-medical technical evacuations then followed by paramedics for immediate, proper, careful medical evaluations at hospitals.

== History ==
Folk medicine, including ancient medicine of Egyptians, Greeks, Celts, Turks, Slavs, Maya, Aztecs and Chinese, has used bruising as a treatment for some health problems. The methods vary widely and include cupping, scraping, and slapping. Fire cupping uses suction which causes bruising in patients. Scraping (gua sha) uses a small hand device with a rounded edge to gently scrape the scalp or the skin. Another ancient device that creates mild bruising is a strigil, used by Greeks and Romans in the bath. Archaeologically there is no precedent for scraping tools before Greek archaeological evidence, not Chinese or Egyptian.

== Etymology and pronunciation ==
The word ecchymosis (/ˌɛkɪˈmoʊsɪs/; plural ecchymoses, /ˌɛkɪˈmoʊsiːs/), comes to English from Neo-Latin, based on Greek ἐκχύμωσις, ekchymōsis, from ἐκχυμοῦσθαι, ekchymousthai, 'to extravasate blood', from ἐκ-, ek- (elided to ἐ-, e-) and χυμός, chymos, 'juice'. Compare enchyma, "tissue infused with organic juice"; elaboration from chyme, the formative juice of tissues.

== See also ==
- Blunt trauma
- Black eye
- Blister
- Burn
- Cerebral contusion — bruising of brain tissue
- Compartment syndrome
- Crush syndrome
- Kissing contusion — contusions of both surfaces of the knee joint
- Livor mortis
- Love-bite — bruising created by excessive suction of a particular area of skin, associated with an individual kissing or sucking the affected area beforehand
- Myocardial contusion — bruising of the heart muscle
- Pallor mortis
- Pulmonary contusion — bruising of lung tissue
- Rhabdomyolysis
- Ship foot — a bruise underneath the toenail
- Subconjunctival hemorrhage
- Welts
