= Seigo Minami =

Japanese dermatologist

- Born: November 1, 1893; Hiroshima Prefecture, Japan
- Died: September 6, 1975 (aged 81)
- Occupations: Professor of Dermatology, at Okayama University and Kyushu University, later private dermatologist. Part Time Pathologist.
- Known for: Discovery of Crush syndrome. Education of many dermatologists and the Minami Award in order to help dermatological studies

Seigo Minami (皆見 省吾, Minami Seigo; November 1, 1893 – September 6, 1975) was a Japanese dermatologist. In 1923, he first reported crush syndrome while he was studying in Germany. He worked as professor of dermatology at Okayama University and Kyushu University. To stimulate dermatological research among young Japanese dermatologists, he created the Minami Awards.

== Life ==
Minami was born on November 1, 1893, in Hiroshima Prefecture. After graduating from Tokyo University in 1918, he went to Berlin in 1922 to study, where he translated the book World history of syphilis into German under the supervision of Keizo Dohi. He studied pathology under Professor Pick in and published a paper which was the first report on crush syndrome. Later he helped Otto Heinrich Warburg to obtain the Nobel Prize for physiology and medicine.

In 1924, Minami became Professor of Dermatology at Okayama University and, in 1931, Professor of Dermatology at Kyushu University. He retired in 1948 and founded the Minami Syphilis Research Institute and Hospital in Fukuoka. To stimulate dermatology research among young Japanese physicians, he established the Minami Award in 1954, which now consists of a monetary prize presented by the Japanese Dermatological Association. In 1966, he received the best physician award of the Japan Medical Association.

== See also ==
- Seigo Minami reported Crush syndrome for the first time in the world. Matsuki Akitomo, Masui (Anestheology), 55,2,222-228, 2006. (in Japanese)
