= Strain (injury) =

Injury due to slight tearing of a muscle or tendon

- Other names: Muscle strain, pulled muscle, torn muscle
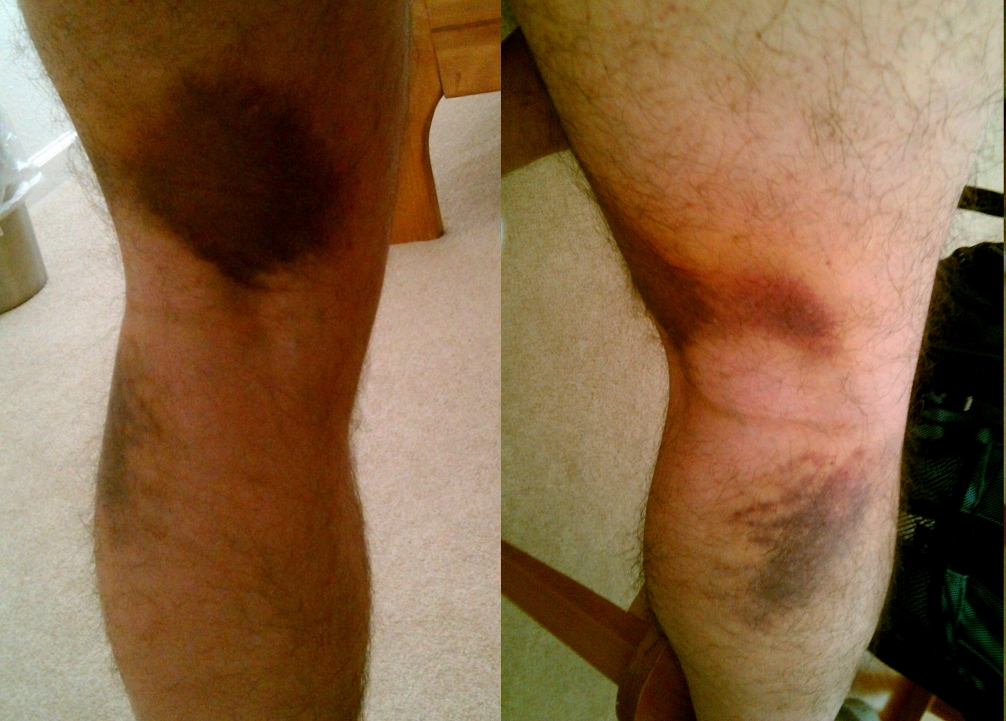
- Two images of the same strain to the hamstring and associated bruising.
- Specialty: Emergency medicine, sports medicine
- Symptoms: Bruise, swelling, redness and soreness
- Causes: Excessive stress and/or repeated injury on a muscle

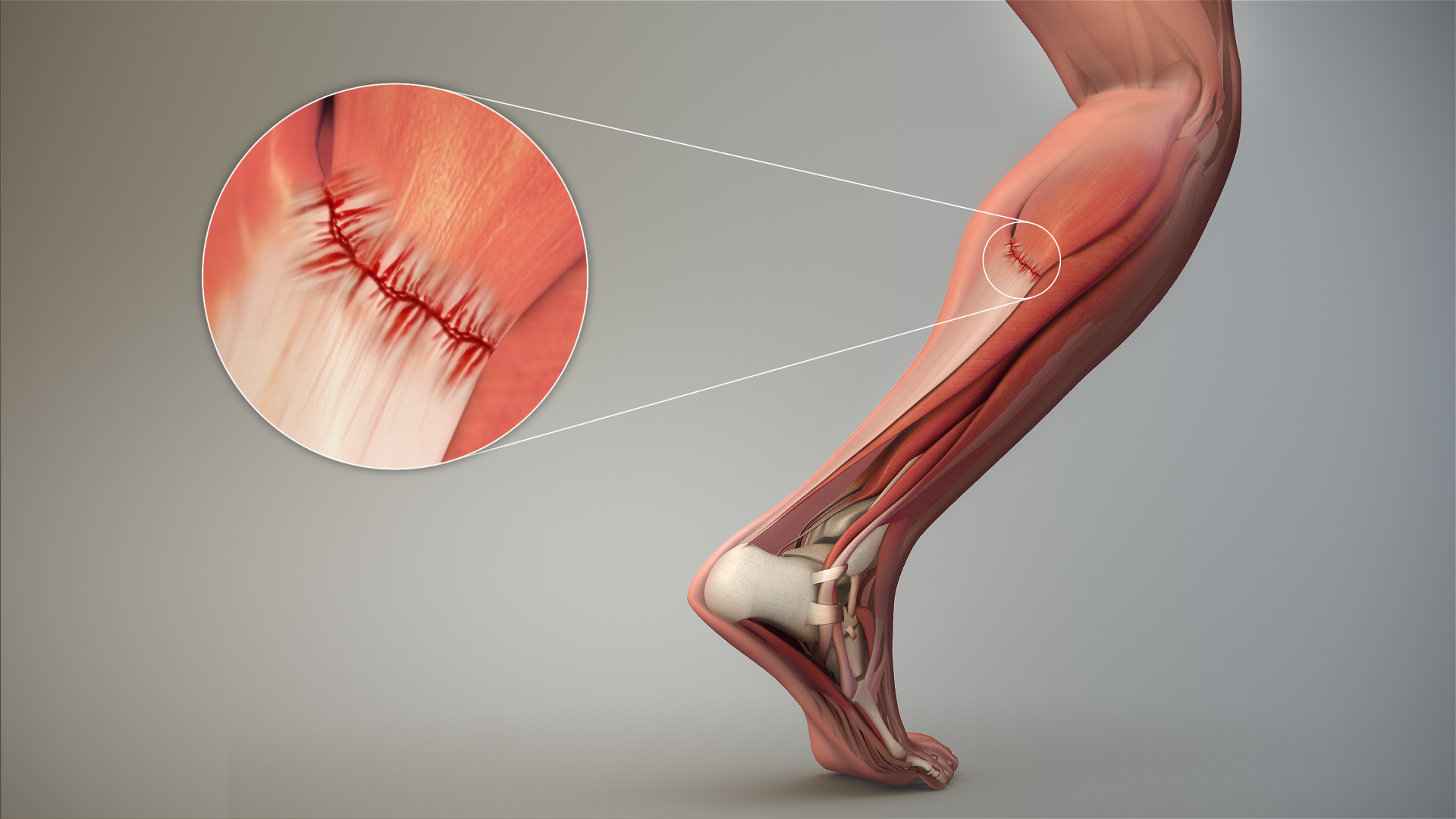
3D animation depicting strain

A strain is an acute soft tissue injury that occurs to a muscle. The equivalent injury to a ligament is a sprain. A strain is the streatching or tearing muscle fibers. Severity of such an injury can be calissfied into three classes. Strains are usually the result of a muscle that has been stretched passed its limit or a muscle that has been contracted to strongly. In other words, eccentric contraction, meaning that the muscle is lengthened while it is contracting. Often times, the body repairs strains in a few weeks. In other cases, medical treatment is needed.

== Cause ==
A strain can occur as a result of improper body mechanics with any activity (e.g., contact sports, lifting heavy objects) that can induce mechanical trauma or injury. Generally, the muscle or tendon overstretches and is placed under more physical stress than it can withstand. Strains commonly result in a partial or complete tear of a tendon or muscle, or they can be severe in the form of a complete tendon rupture. Strains most commonly occur in the foot, leg, or back. Acute strains are more closely associated with recent mechanical trauma or injury. Chronic strains typically result from repetitive movement of the muscles and tendons over a long period of time.

The most common strain injuries occur in athletes with over 90% of injuries consisting of strains. The most common sport to see muscle strains are those consisting of jumping or running.

== Signs and symptoms ==
The symptoms of strain are pain and interference with activities and difficulty generating strength due to pain. Symptoms can vary, the most common include: swelling, discoloration, decrease in muscle strength, a gap or indent in the muscle outline, and at the time of injury a popping action. It is important to note two things: the actual strength of the muscle is not affected unless there is a complete rupture, and contusion and swelling are uncommon because of the muscles deep anatomical location. The signs of a strain include tenderness (pain when one pushes on the muscle) and pain with stretch of the muscle.

== Pathophysiology ==
Degrees of Injury (as classified by the American College of Sports Medicine):

- First degree (mildest) – little tissue tearing; mild tenderness; pain with full range of motion.
- Second degree – torn muscle or tendon tissues; painful, limited motion; possibly some swelling or depression at the spot of the injury.
- Third degree (most severe) – limited or no movement; severe acute pain, though sometimes painless straight after the initial injury

To establish a uniform definition amongst healthcare providers, in 2012 a Consensus Statement on suggested new terminology and classification of muscle injuries was published.

The classifications suggested were:

The major difference suggested was the use of "indirect" muscle injury verse "grade 1" to provide subclassifications when advanced images were negative.

Indirect Muscle Injury FUNCTIONAL (Negative MSK US & MRI)

- Type 1: Overexertion-related Muscle Disorder
  - Type 1a: Fatigue induced
  - Type 1b: DOMS

• Type 2: Neuromuscular muscle disorder

  - Type 2a: Spine-Related
  - Type 2b: Muscle-Related

STRUCTURAL MUSCLE INJURY (Positive MSK US & MRI) • Type 3: Partial Muscle Tear • Type 4: (Sub) total tear

DIRECT MUSCLE INJURY • Bump or Cut: Contact-related

=== Risk factors ===
Although strains are not restricted to athletes and can happen while doing everyday tasks, it is common for an injury to develop when there is a sudden increase in duration, intensity, or frequency of an activity.

== Diagnosing ==
When diagnosing a strain, a clinical examination by your docctor would included palpating and evaluating the targeted pain area. Additional examinination of the area for muscle tenderness, decrease in muscle movement, and overall weakness can point to the degree of strain. If it is clear what degree of strain you have, additional testing is often not needed. Diagnosing the degree of injury can then determine the next steps to recovery. If there is no clear degree, further examination like an MRI would be done. Being well prepared prior for questions from your doctor about possible past injuries related to that muscle and the specific action that began the muscle pain is also vital information.

== Treatment and Recovery ==
The first-line treatment for a muscular strain in the acute phase include five steps commonly known as R.I.C.E.

- Rest: Rest is necessary to accelerate healing and reduce the potential for re-injury.
- Ice: Apply ice to induce vasoconstriction, which will reduce blood flow to the site of injury. Never ice for more than 20 minutes at a time.
- Compression: Wrap the strained area with a soft-wrapped bandage to reduce further diapedesis and promote lymphatic drainage.
- Elevation: Keep the strained area as close to the level of the heart as is possible in order to promote venous blood return to the systemic circulation.

The objectice of R.I.C.E is to minimize bleeding in the ruputred site. These four steps are an attempt to reduce scaring size after rejuvination.

Immediate treatment is usually an adjunctive therapy of Nonsteroidal anti-inflammatory drugs (NSAIDs)s and cold compression therapy. Cold compression therapy acts to reduce swelling and pain by reducing leukocyte extravasation into the injured area. NSAIDs such as Ibuprofen/paracetamol work to reduce the immediate inflammation by inhibiting Cox-1 and Cox-2 enzymes, which are the enzymes responsible for converting arachidonic acid into prostaglandin. However, NSAIDs, including aspirin and ibuprofen, affect platelet function (this is why they are known as "blood thinners") and should not be taken during the period when tissue is bleeding because they will tend to increase blood flow, inhibit clotting, and thereby increase bleeding and swelling. After the bleeding has stopped, NSAIDs can be used with some effectiveness to reduce inflammation and pain.

A new treatment for acute strains is the use of platelet rich plasma (PRP) injections which have been shown to accelerate recovery from non-surgical muscular injuries.

It is recommended that the person injured should consult a medical provider if the injury is accompanied by severe pain, if the limb cannot be used, or if there is noticeable tenderness over an isolated spot. These can be signs of a broken or fractured bone, a sprain, or a complete muscle tear.

== Prevention ==
Prevention is a key aspect of pre and post strain injury. Some of the best ways to prevent muscle strains consist of warming up your muscles prior to any extreme (or light) physical activity. Strength training your muscles is a great way to build durable muscles that can withstand sudden harsh movements. Using proper lifting techniques is another great way to prevent your muscles from contracting to strongly, or stretching too far.

== See also ==
- Achilles tendon rupture
- Pulled hamstring
- Repetitive strain injury
