= Soft tissue injury =

Damage of muscles, ligaments and tendons throughout the body

A soft tissue injury is the damage of muscles, ligaments and tendons throughout the body. Common soft tissue injuries usually occur from a sprain, strain, a one-off blow resulting in a contusion or overuse of a particular part of the body. Soft tissue injuries can result in pain, swelling, bruising and loss of function.

== Signs and symptoms ==
=== Sprains ===
A sprain is a type of acute injury which results from the stretching or tearing of a ligament. Depending on the severity of the sprain, the movement on the joint can be compromised since ligaments aid in the stability and support of joints. Sprains are commonly seen in vulnerable areas such as the wrists, knees and ankles. They can occur from movements such as falling on an outstretched hand or a twisting of the ankle or foot.

The severity of a sprain can be classified:

- Grade 1: Only some of the fibers in the ligament are torn, and the injured site is moderately painful and swollen. Function in the joint will be unaffected for the most part.
- Grade 2: Many of the ligament fibers are torn, and pain and swelling is moderate. The functionality of the joint is compromised.
- Grade 3: The soft tissue is completely torn, and functionality and strength on the joint is completely compromised. In most cases, surgery is needed to repair the damage.

=== Strains ===
A strain is a type of acute injury that occurs to the muscle or tendon. Similar to sprains, it can vary in severity, from a stretching of the muscle or tendon to a complete tear of the tendon from the muscle. Some of the most common places that strains occur are in the foot, back of the leg (hamstring), or back.

=== Bruising (contusion) ===
A contusion is the discoloration of the skin, which results from underlying muscle fibers and connective tissue being crushed. This can happen in a variety of ways such as a direct blow to the skin, or a fall taken against a hard surface. The discoloration in the skin is present when blood begins to pool around the injury.

=== Tendinitis ===
Tendinitis is a type of overuse injury to the tendons, which demonstrates signs of inflammation of tendons around a joint. Tendinitis is the most common cause of shoulder pain and also leg pain. Tendinitis occurs when there is repetitive stress on the subacromial bursa, which causes the bones to make contact with the tendons and irritate them.

== Diagnosis ==
=== Classifications ===
==== Acute injuries ====
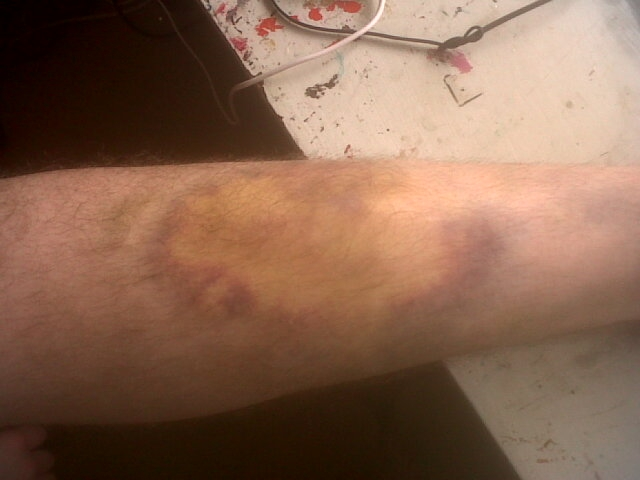
Bruising is a type of acute soft tissue injury.

Any type of injury that occurs to the body through sudden trauma, such as a fall, twist or blow to the body. A few examples of this type of injury would be sprains, strains and contusions.

==== Overuse injuries ====
An overuse injury occurs when a certain activity is repeated frequently and the body does not have enough time to recover between occurrences. Examples include bursitis and tendinitis.

=== Commonly injured tissues ===
With examples of each. Parentheses indicate location in body

- Ligaments

Anterior cruciate ligament (knee), medial collateral ligament (knee), ulnar collateral ligaments (wrist/hand), interspinous ligaments (vertebrae)

- Muscles

Biceps brachii (upper arm), rectus femoris (thigh), transverse abdominis (abdominals)

- Tendons

Patellar tendon (knee), calcaneal/Achilles tendon (foot/lower leg), biceps tendon (shoulder/elbow)

- Cartilage

Menisci (knee), intervertebral discs (spine), acetabulum (hip)

== Management ==
=== Treatment ===
Care for a soft tissue injury depends upon the structures that have been injured and the degree of injury. Non-surgical interventions become less effective with the amount of damage or tearing, with complete tears often requiring invasive surgical repair. For most injuries, it is recommended to have an initial period of rest and unloading of the injured part for one to three days, followed by gradual increase in structural load. Many injuries have more specific treatments based upon the damaged muscle, such as shockwave therapy and injections of corticosteroid and saline solutions.

A medical professional should evaluate painful injuries and changes in soft tissue function. To make a full diagnosis, they may use nerve conduction studies to localize nerve dysfunction (e.g. carpal tunnel syndrome), assess severity, and help with prognosis. Electrodiagnosis also helps differentiate between myopathy and neuropathy. Magnetic resonance imaging is most commonly used to evaluate soft tissue injuries that may require surgical repair. Immediately following injury, the damaged tissue is often cooled, with some people choosing to continue cooling as a regular part of healing. In recent years, the use of cryotherapy in soft tissue injury management has been challenged extensively. Cooling minimizes the inflammatory process and edema, which is believed to help one recover from a soft-tissue injury. However, prolonged usage of cooling slows healing in animal models. Instead, cooling should be restricted to within 24-48 hours of the injury. However, creatine kinase-MB isoform and myoglobin levels circulating in the blood are increased after exercising. Excessive cooling may impede the recovery process by keeping the Creatine kinase-MB isoform and myoglobin levels increased 2–3 days post exercise. When possible, the affected limb is elevated above the level of the heart, and is compressed using adhesive tape. Evidence supporting elevation and compression is weak, but continues to be widely practiced.

=== RICE method ===
The RICE method is an frequently used mnemonic acronym used in the initial treatment of a soft tissue injury. It has been widely challenged in recent years in favor of other treatment recommendations.

Rest
It is suggested that the patient take a break from the activity that caused the injury in order to give the injury time to heal.
Ice
The injury should be iced on and off in 20 minute intervals, avoiding direct contact of the ice with the skin.
Compression
Bandaging the injury will compress it, and prevent any further bleeding or swelling from occurring.
Elevation
Elevating the injury above the heart while resting will aid in the reduction of swelling.

=== No HARM protocol ===
This mnemonic indicates what not to do within the first 48–72 hours after the injury in order to speed up the recovery process.

No Heat
Applying heat to the injured area can cause blood flow and swelling to increase.
No Alcohol
Alcohol can inhibit the ability to feel if the injury is becoming more aggravated, as well as increasing blood flow and swelling.
No Re-injury
Avoid any activities that could aggravate the injury and cause further damage.
No Massage
Massaging an injured area can promote blood flow and swelling, and potentially cause more damage if done too early.

== Sources ==
- Flegel, Melinda J. (2004). Sport first aid: A coach's guide to preventing and responding to injuries. Hong Kong, Japan: Human Kinetics.
- Lindsay, R., Watson, G., Hickmont, D., Broadfoot, A., & Bruynel, L. (1994). Treat your own strains sprains and bruises. New Zealand: Spinal Publications.
- Lovering, R.M. (2008). "Physical therapy and related interventions". In P.M. Tiidus (ed.), Skeletal muscle damage and repair (pp. 219–230). United States of America: Human Kinetics.
- Prentice, William E. "Tissue Response to Injury", Principles of Athletic Training: A Competency Based Approach. 14th ed. New York: McGraw Hill Companies, 2011. 260–277.
- Subotnick, Steven (1991). Sports and Exercise Injuries: Conventional, Homeopathic and Alternative Treatments. California, United States of America: North Atlantic Books.
