= Cold compression therapy =

Therapy to reduce pain and swelling

- Other names: Hilotherapy

Cold compression therapy, also known as hilotherapy, combines two of the principles of rest, ice, compression, elevation to reduce pain and swelling from a sports or activity injury to soft tissues and is recommended by orthopedic surgeons following surgery. The therapy is especially useful for sprains, strains, pulled muscles and pulled ligaments.

== Cold compression ==
Cold compression is a combination of cryotherapy and static compression, commonly used for the treatment of pain and inflammation after acute injury or surgical procedures. Cryotherapy, the use of ice or cold in a therapeutic setting, has become one of the most common treatments in orthopedic medicine. The primary reason for using cryotherapy in acute injury management is to lower the temperature of the injured tissue, which reduces the tissue's metabolic rate and helps the tissue to survive the period following the injury. It is well documented that metabolic rate decreases by application of cryotherapy.

A study found that current literature on the use of cryotherapy on acute ankle sprains has insufficient evidence for the efficacy.

Static compression is often used in conjunction with cryotherapy for the care of acute injuries. To date, the primary reason for using compression is to increase external pressure on the tissue to prevent edema formation (swelling). This occurs by hindering fluid loss from the vessels in the injured area, making it more difficult for fluids to accumulate. Ice with compression is significantly colder than ice alone due to improved skin contact and increased tissue density caused by extended static compression. Tissue reaches its lowest temperature faster and the tissue maintains its cool even after treatment ends.

Compression therapy has been used in deep venous thrombosis prevention, wound care, as well as managing edema. Literature suggests that compression therapy use for perioperative ankle fractures will be beneficial for edema reduction and therefore, will probably be beneficial for pain and ankle joint mobility as well. Post operative arthroscopic surgeries also shows significant recovery with cold compression.

It has been studied following facial surgery where it has been found to decrease pain and swelling on day two or three. In athletes, cryotherapy has its greatest effect on recovery by using it within the first 24 hours of exercise or injury. Cryotherapy has also been shown that it can increase joint flexibility. It is unclear if it affects the risk of bruising.

== Devices ==
Continuous cold therapy devices (also called ice machines) which circulate ice water through a pad are currently the subject of class action lawsuits for skin and tissue damage caused by excessive cooling or icing time and lack of temperature control. Reported injuries range from frostbite to severe tissue damage resulting in amputation.

Studies have shown that the body activates the hunting reaction after only 10 minutes of cryotherapy, at temperatures less than 9.5 °C (49 °F). The hunting response is a cycle of vasoconstriction (decreased blood flow), then vasodilation (increased blood flow) that increases the delivery of oxygen and nutrient rich blood to the tissue. Studies show a debate whether cold should be used or not for faster recovery. Increased blood flow can slow cell death, limit tissue damage and aid in the removal of cellular debris and waste products. Under normal circumstances the hunting reaction would be essential to tissue health but only serves to increase pain, inflammation and cell death as excess blood is forced into the area.

== Wraps ==
Cold compression wraps using either re-freezable ice or gel are a much safer product, as such products do not exceed the cooling or icing time recommended by the established medical community.

Many of the ice wraps available use adjustable elastic straps to aid in compression over the injured areas. More advanced single-use wraps have guidelines to indicate how the bandage should be applied in order to achieve optimum compression required for an acute injury.

Most ice wraps that use ice, have a built-in protective layer, so ice is not applied directly to the skin, which can result in a burn to the area, sometimes known as a "cryoburn".

== See also ==
- Achilles tendinitis
- Dermatitis
- Plantar fasciitis
- Repetitive strain injury
- Rotator cuff
- Sprain
- Strain (injury)
- Tennis elbow
- Torn rotator cuff
