= RICE (medicine) =

Medical acronym

- Rest, ice, compression, and elevation

RICE is a mnemonic acronym for four parts of a treatment commonly used to help pain and healing of soft tissue injuries, like sprains, strains, cuts, bruises, and other minor injuries. It stands for: Rest, Ice, Compression, and Elevation. The goal of this treatment was to reduce pain and swelling. Some recent studies have not shown that may not be effective. Early gentle movement is more often recommended as of 2020, with the acknowledgment that sometimes short term immobilization is needed for pain.

The mnemonic was first created by Gabe Mirkin in 1978. In 2014, he publicly revised his views for routine icing and complete rest after reviewing research on inflammation and tissue healing. Mirkin stated that long periods of icing and complete rest could delay recovery. Since some inflammation is helpful in the healing process and there can be downsides of too much rest. Current evidence suggests that routine icing should be reconsidered, but it may still be ok in cases where a lot of swelling could be bad for recovery.

There are variations which emphasize other actions, including PRICE with the addition of protection (P), and POLICE with the addition of optimal loading ("OL"). However, these variations also lack enough evidence to be widely recommended. In 2019, the mnemonic PEACE & LOVE was introduced in the British Journal of Sports Medicine (BJSM) as an update to earlier protocols. Unlike previous protocols, it gets rid of routine icing and emphasizes early gentle movement and active recovery.

== Primary terms ==
=== Rest ===
Rest referred to limiting the use of an injured area. It was once recommended to rest an injury for up to 2 days or until it was no longer painful to use. It was intended to reduce inflammation and to prevent further injury. Blood supply is an important component of inflammation and healing. By resting an injury, blood flow to the area is reduced, which reduces the swelling and pain associated with inflammation. The early stages of healing involve microscopic scaffolding that is built upon to repair an injury. These scaffolds are relatively weak until reinforced by later stages of healing. Early and aggressive movement could potentially disrupt the scaffolds, delaying healing or worsen an existing injury.

Although rest may provide some benefit immediately after an injury, returning to movement early has been shown to be better at reducing pain and encouraging healing.

=== Ice ===
Ice and elevation
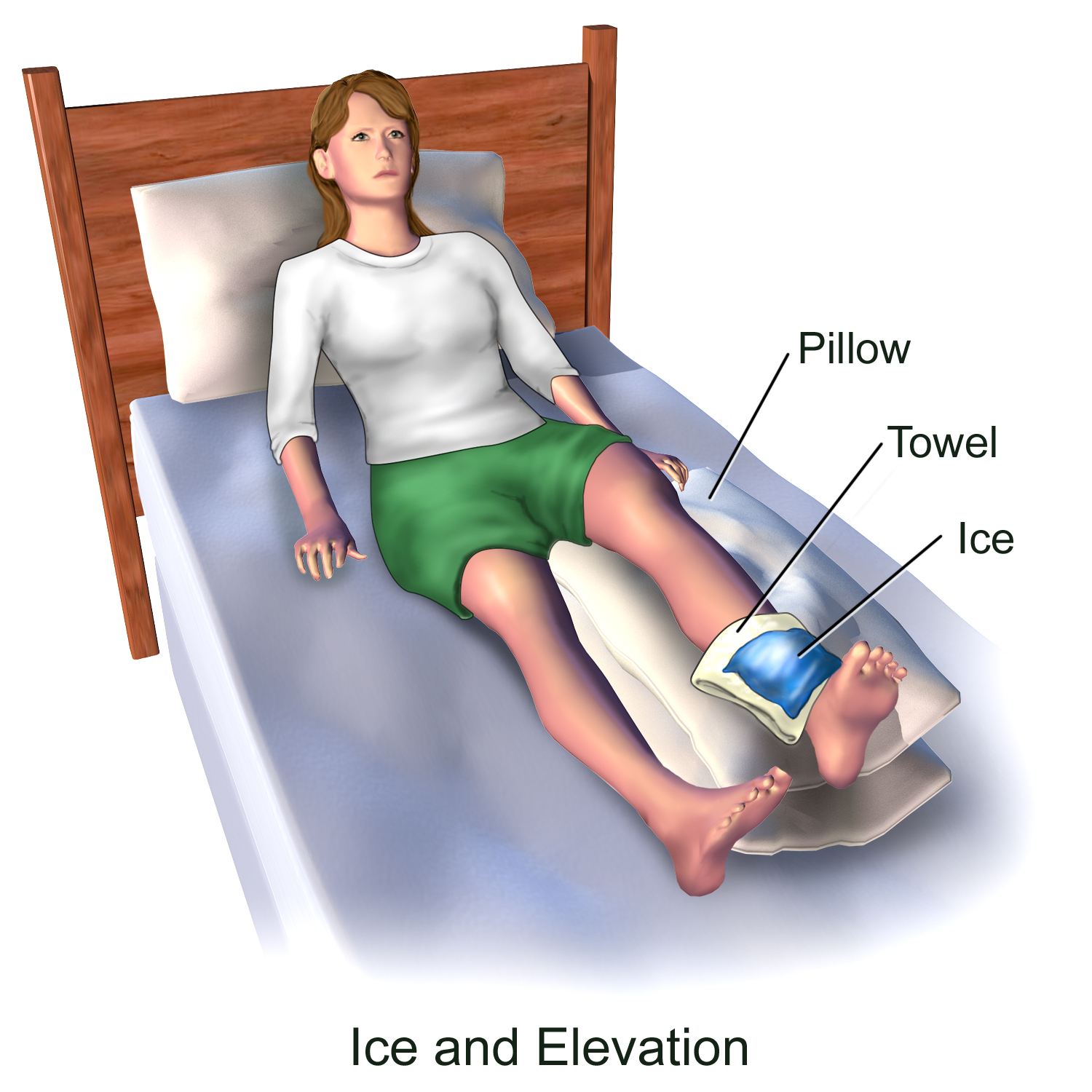
- Ice being applied to a leg propped on a pillow for elevation

Ice referred to the application of cold to an injury, such as ice, an icepack, or frozen vegetables. It was meant to reduce swelling and inflammation by vasoconstriction. However, adequate blood flow is essential in allowing cells and signals from the immune system to reach injured areas. By reducing the entry of these cells and signals to the injury, healing can be delayed, or possibly inhibited.

The current research supports the role of ice in temporary pain relief, but there is little evidence supporting the use of ice to aid in healing, or even swelling reduction. Further research is needed to further understand how ice should be applied. At this time, due to the lack of evidence, there is no consensus on the ideal temperature ranges, time frames, application methods, or patient populations when using ice on a soft tissue injury. Most studies use icing protocols of intermittent 10-20 minute applications, several times a day for the first few days following an injury.

=== Compression ===
Compression referred to wearing bandages, stockings, braces, or similar devices to apply pressure over a localized area to reduce swelling and stop bleeding. The increased pressure pushes fluids into the blood vessels to drain away from the area. The effects of compression on swelling reduction are temporary and gravity-dependent.

Although studies have demonstrated the effects of compression on swelling, there is little evidence to support the use of compression to promote healing. When considering the use of compression, the evidence supports the use of elastic bandages with intermittent pneumatic compression (IPC) to reduce swelling and pain, while improving range of motion.

=== Elevation ===
Elevation referred to keeping an injury above the level of the heart, such as propping up a leg with pillows. The goal was to reduce swelling by using gravity to encourage blood return from the swollen area back to the heart. The reduction in swelling could improve pain by relieving pressure from the area. The effects of elevation on swelling have been shown to be temporary, as swelling returns when the injured area is no longer elevated.

However, at this time there is little evidence to support that elevation promotes healing.

== Criticism ==
Gabe Mirkin has since recanted his support for the regimen. In 2015 he wrote:

Coaches have used my 'RICE' guideline for decades, but now it appears that both ice and complete rest may delay healing, instead of helping. The reasoning for this lies within the natural healing process. When an injury is created the body has to go through a very specific sequence to heal said injuries. For the next step the step prior has to be completed. The first step in the sequence is inflammation. If you use ice to reduce inflammation, it is only going to slow the healing process because inflammation needs to be complete for the sequence to keep progressing. In a recent study, athletes were told to exercise so intensely that they developed severe muscle damage that caused extensive muscle soreness. Although cooling delayed swelling, it did not hasten recovery from this muscle damage.

Rest may play a role immediately after an injury, but the evidence supports early mobilization to promote healing. Due to the inhibitory effects of ice on mounting a proper inflammatory response, a protocol including extended applications of ice could delay the body's attempt at healing. While it is unclear what the effects of elevation and compression are on the healing process, reduction of swelling is a transient effect and returns when the injury is returned to a lower, gravity-dependent position.

In 2019 the mnemonic "PEACE & LOVE" was coined by Blaise Dubois. The PEACE stands for protection, elevation, avoid anti-inflammatories, compression, and education. The LOVE component stands for load, optimism, vascularization, and exercise. It first guides initial treatment and second the later treatment of soft tissue injuries. A number of guidelines; however, still support the use of NSAIDs. Some also suggest heat to treat acute and soft tissue injuries.

== Variations ==
Variations of the acronym are sometimes used to emphasize additional steps that should be taken. These include:

- "PRICE" – Protection, Rest, Ice, Compression, and Elevation
- "POLICE" – Protection, Optimal Loading, Ice, Compression, and Elevation
- "PEACE & LOVE" – Protection, Elevation, Avoid Anti-inflammatories, Avoid icing, Compression, Education & Load, Optimism, Vascularization, Exercise
