= Shaft bow =

Bow of wood connecting shafts over horse

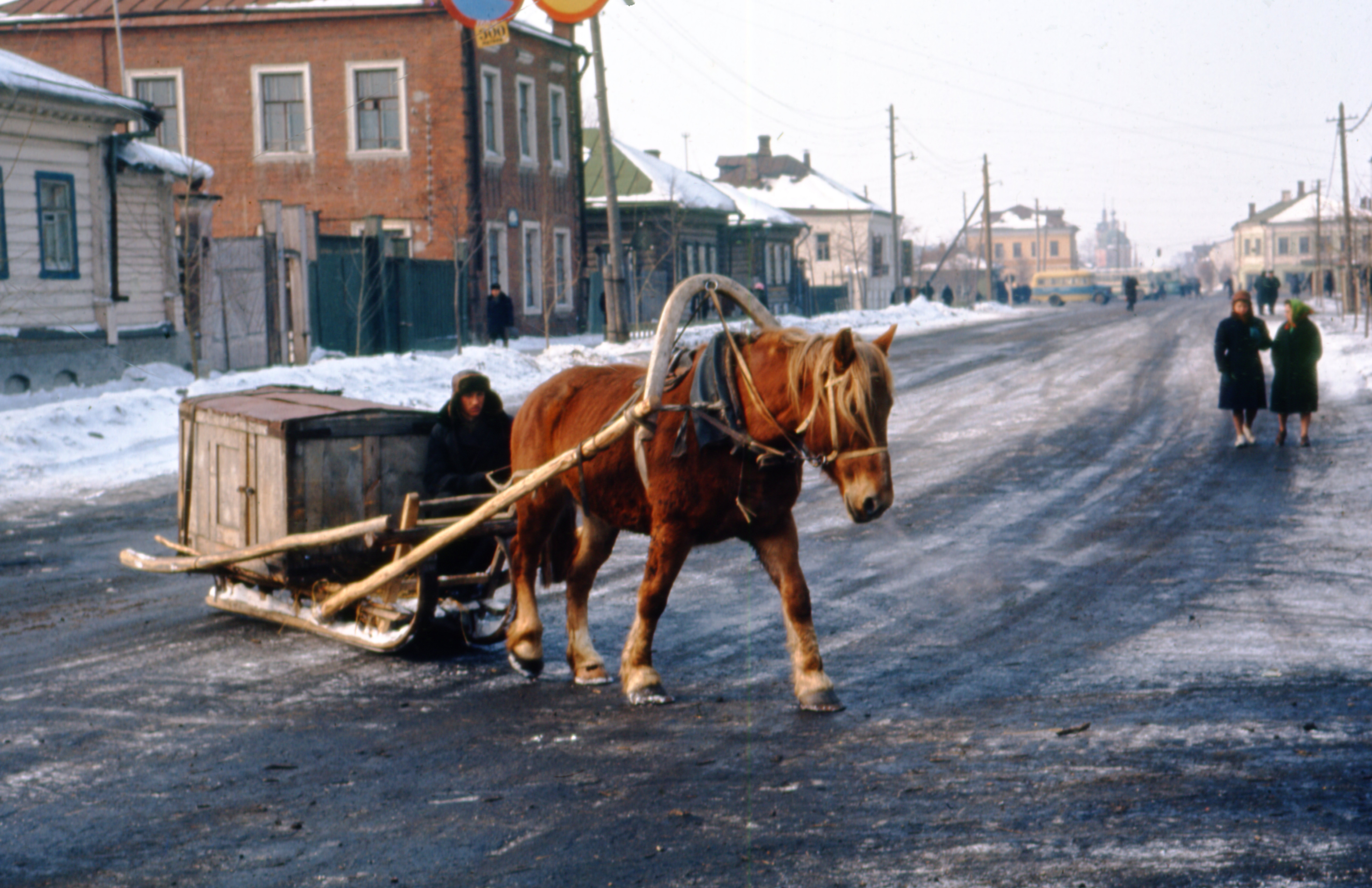
Horse drawn sled with shaft bow, Russia 1964

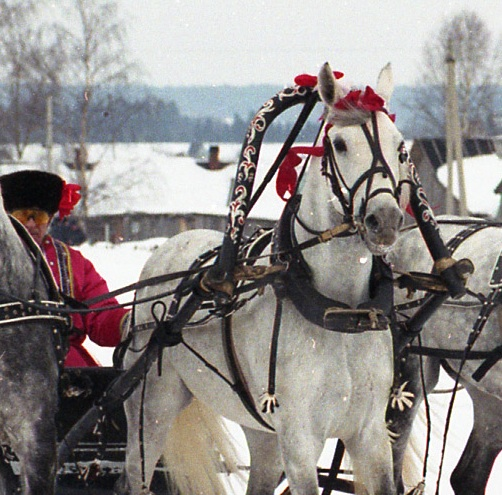
Horse in a troika harness with a shaft bow

A shaft bow is an element of horse harness that is attached to the front of the shafts of a horse-drawn vehicle and joins them by arching high above the neck of the horse. Use of the shaft bow is widespread in the area east of the Baltic Sea (Russia, Finland and the eastern Baltic countries). A shaft bow is also used in traditional harness in Sicily. It is seldom seen in other parts of the world.

== Use ==
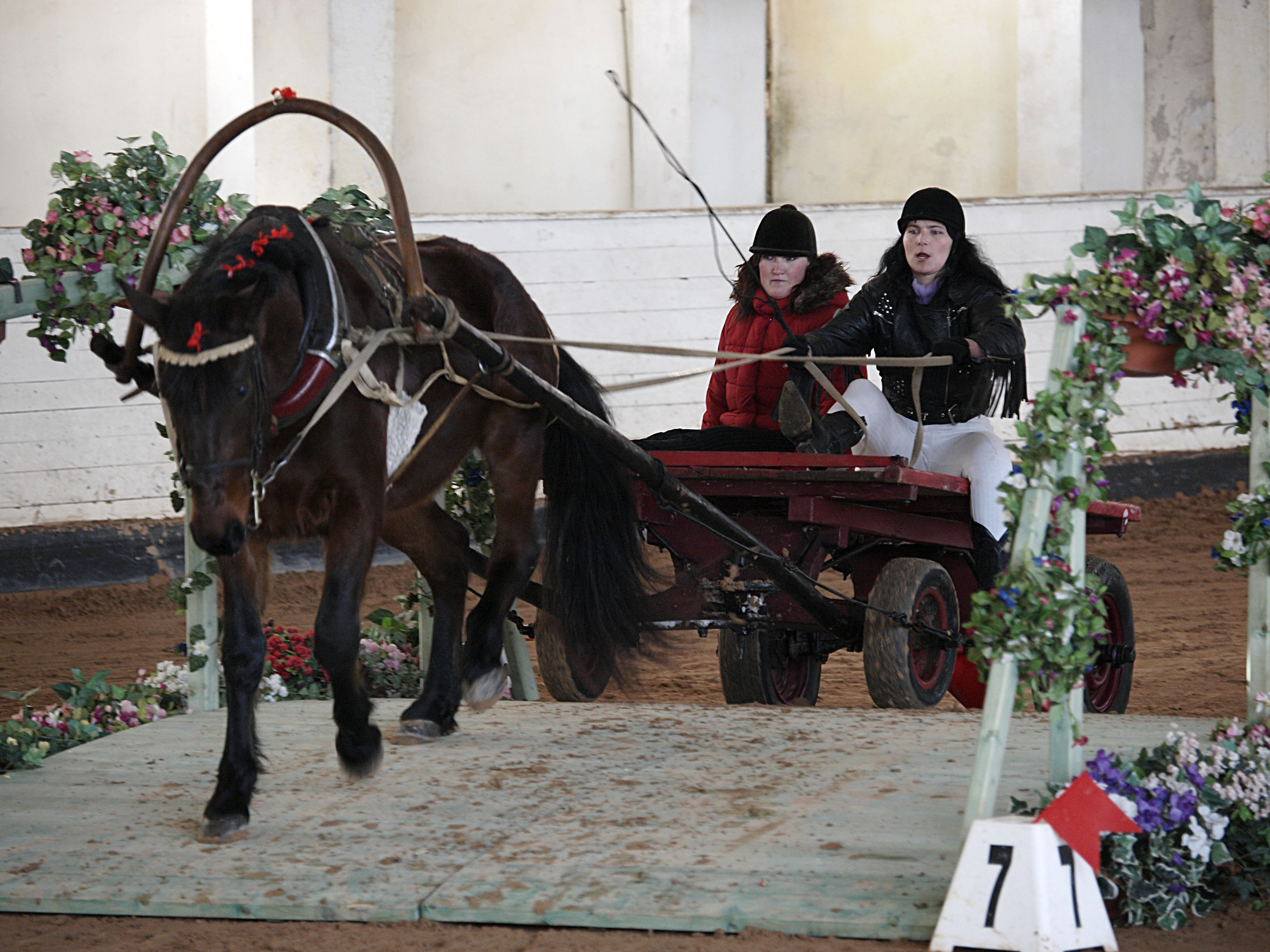
Shaft bow harness in use at a combined driving contest in Latvia.

A shaft bow may be used over a single horse, or over the middle horse in a troika.

The shaft bow is well-suited for a light horse pulling a heavy load. In Eastern Finland the shaft bow was traditionally used all year round, while in the flatter Western Finland area, it was reserved mainly for winter and sleigh driving; in the summer a breastcollar was used, on its own or with a shaft bow. The shaft bow was used with horse breeds such as the Finnhorse, a light but strong breed, fast compared to the heavy draft horses of Western Europe. The shaft bow functions somewhat like a spring, allowing for a smoother start, thus making it easier for a horse to take off when pulling larger loads than it could without the shaft bow.

== History and distribution ==
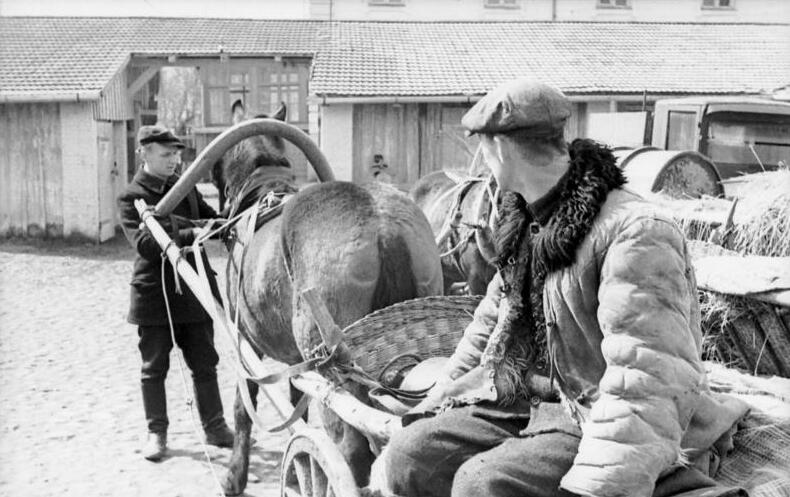
Russia, 1942

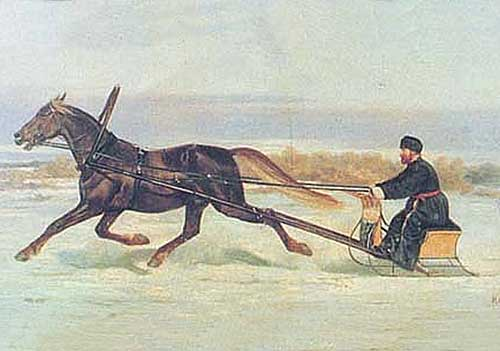
An Orlov trotter raced in harness with a shaft bow

The shaft bow is in common use in the areas east from the Baltic Sea. Its area of distribution is contiguous; in addition to Finland and Estonia, it has been used by other Baltic Finnic peoples in Russia. The Russian adopted the shaft bow from Finland. In Sweden, the shaft bow has only been used by the Forest Finns of Värmland. In Western Europe and in the Americas the shaft bow is practically unknown.

According to the ethnologist and historian Kustaa Vilkuna, the main factor connecting the Finnish horse driving culture is the shaft bow, and the first records of shaft bow usage are from Finland and Estonia. In the ancient cantos and the Kalevala the shaft bow is very commonplace, and the first literary record of the shaft bow is from the 1430s, in the death-lay of Bishop Henry. The first Estonian record is from 1494. Records from Russia occur at a later date. Shaft bows appear in Russian trade inventories in the 17th century. They appear in Sweden later yet– the Swedish explorer and naturalist Carl von Linné only saw his first shaft bow in Finland in 1732.

In old Finnish tax records, shaft bows were considered assets of the house. The Nyynäinen house in Lemu was recorded as possessing two painted shaft bows in 1549. Based on tax records from the 18th century, the shaft bow was widespread all over Finland.

== Terminology ==
The shaft bow has different names in different languages and dialects. The commonly used, standard term in Finnish is luokka or luokki. Luokki is the form used in the eastern dialects of Finnish, luokka is used in the western ones. In Karelian, the shaft bow is called vemmel, vempele or vembel depending on the region. In addition to Finnish, the word luokki also appears in Votic, Estonian (look) and Livonian. In Russian the shaft bow is called simply an "arch", Russian: дуга (duga). In Finnish, the word vemmel is rarely in use but is recognised as a synonym for arch. The Finnish terms are ancient, and words like vemmelsääri (bowleg or luokki leg) to mean a hare in a playful context are still in use.

Historically, Finnish-English dictionaries have rendered luokki as collar bow, but shaft bow is both more precise and in general use. It appears in numerous translations of works by Leo Tolstoy.

In Sicily the shaft bow is called a sellone.

== Manufacture ==
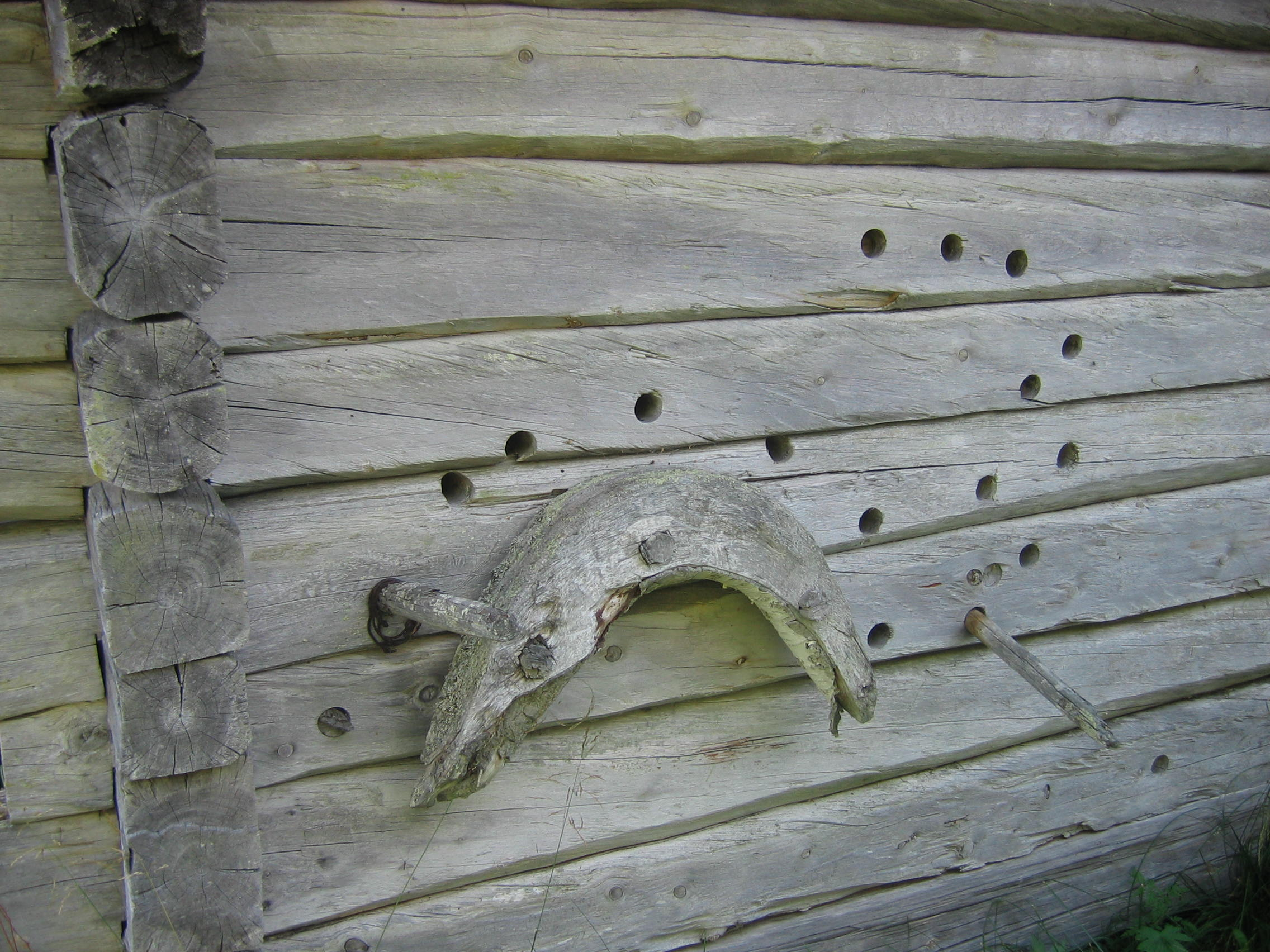
A jig for bending shaft bows, on the back wall of the stables of Tiainen tenant farm, Puolanka, Kalhamaperä.

In Finland usually the shaft bow is made of springy wood, but in Russia cast iron versions are common.

The usual wood for making a Finnish shaft bow is European white elm and small-leaved lime, which are light, flexible, durable, and they keep their shape well. Other trees used for making shaft bows are rowan, yew, juniper and the northern, slowly growing birch. Willow was normally only used for a running repair if a shaft bow broke while working in the forest – it was made by bending and binding two willow rods together.

Nowadays shaft bows may be made of steel, laminated wood, or by the traditional method, of a single, bent piece of wood. The drawbacks of a metal shaft bow is that in very cold weather it might shatter, and the hard metal will wear the wooden shafts quickly. A wooden, so-called "pressed shaft bow" can be made of bird cherry (which is the most durable), lime or birch – all these trees grow slowly in the Finnish climate. The wood is softened by storing it in a dung heap for about a week, warming it by an open fire, steaming it, or using microwaves. After softening the shaft bow is bent using a jig called a paininpuu or paininpenkki. Shaft bows (except for those made of lime) straighten out with time, especially if rarely used. To prevent this, shaft bows are often stored with the ends tied together.

== Adaptation to other uses ==
Gavril Ilizarov's bone-setting invention known as the Ilizarov apparatus was inspired by a shaft bow harness. His initial tests used a semicircular frame similar to the shaft bow; he soon switched to a full circular frame. The Ilizarov apparatus in turn has inspired other medical devices for external fixation, including the Taylor Spatial Frame.
