= CR No Guts No Glory =

American clothing company

CR No Guts No Glory is an American clothing company founded by Charlotte Lloyd Robinson in 2013.

Robinson was born with a hemangioma, a rare disorder that caused vascular tumors to grow in her right tibia, creating holes in her bones and damaging her joints and growth plate. By the time she was 13 years old, her right leg was 2.5 inches shorter than her left and turned at an odd angle. Robinson has been through numerous surgeries and at the age of 13 she had to wear a metal brace on her leg, known as a Taylor Spatial Frame. This device had pins that pierced through the skin and attached directly into the bone. This frame was successful in lengthening Robinson's leg 2.5 inches.

After her surgeries she decided to start her own clothing business, "CR No Guts No Glory", with her own line of snap on underwear suitable for women who are wearing a frame or brace which makes wearing normal underwear impossible. She says "I chose the name No Guts No Glory because it was my motto while in the frame". She has received coverage in ABC News, the Huffington Post, Daily Mail, Medical Daily and has aired on Fox News.
