= Duga =

Duga may refer to:

- Duga (moth), a synonym of a genus of moths
- Duga radar, Soviet radar system deployed 1976–1989
- Duga (magazine), Yugoslav and Serbian weekly news magazine
- Shaft bow, element of horse harness to attach to vehicle shaft

Geography

- Duga Island, island in Adriatic Sea, belonging to Croatia
- Duga Resa, municipality in Karlovac County, Croatia
- Duga, Podgorica, town in Podgorica Municipality, Montenegro
- Duga, Nikšić, town in Nikšić Municipality, Montenegro
- Duga, Štimlje, town in Štimlje municipality, Kosovo
