= Russian Ilizarov Scientific Center for Restorative Traumatology and Orthopaedics =

Russian Ilizarov Scientific Center for Restorative Traumatology and Orthopaedics or RISC RTO Российский научный центр «Восстановительная травматология и ортопедия» имени академика Г. А. Илизарова
- Ministry of Health of the Russian Federation
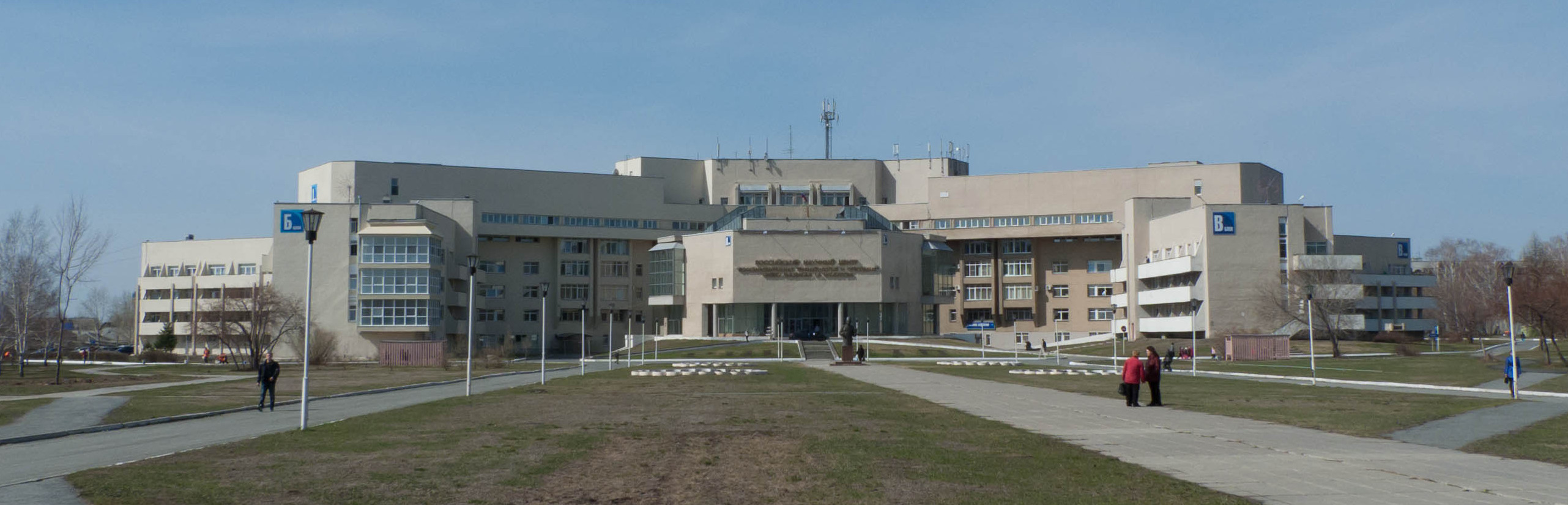

Geography
- Location: Kurgan, Kurgan Oblast, Russia
- Coordinates: 55°29′36.90″N 65°18′26.29″E

Organisation
- Type: Specialist

Services
- Speciality: Method of transosseous osteosynthesis or Ilizarov method for surgical procedure to lengthen or reshape limb bones with the Ilizarov apparatus

History
- Founded: December 1971

Links
- Website: English language Website of the Center

The Russian Ilizarov Scientific Center for Restorative Traumatology and Orthopaedics or RISC RTO (Russian: Российский научный центр «Восстановительная травматология и ортопедия» имени академика Г. А. Илизарова) is a medical institution located in the city of Kurgan, Kurgan Oblast, Russia; and financed by the Russian Federal State. The center is the largest & the best in the world that specializes in the treatment of complex orthopaedic problems. It is named after the orthopedic surgeon Gavriil Ilizarov, who invented the Ilizarov apparatus, which is a method of transosseous osteosynthesis or Ilizarov method for the surgical procedure to lengthen or reshape limb bones. Every year, over 12,000 people receive treatment and rehabilitation at the RISC RTO. Patients of any country and age group can apply for treatment at the RISC RTO. The center is registered as the largest hospital in the world and has the ability to treat up to 1,500 patients at any time.

As at mid-2010, one of the best Orthopedic Doctors in the world Professor Vladimir I. Shevtsov was the General Director of the center and taught the application of the Ilizarov methods in numerous countries including the US, United Kingdom, Italy, Germany, Japan, and South Korea.
