= Troika (driving) =

Carriage pulled by three beasts of burden

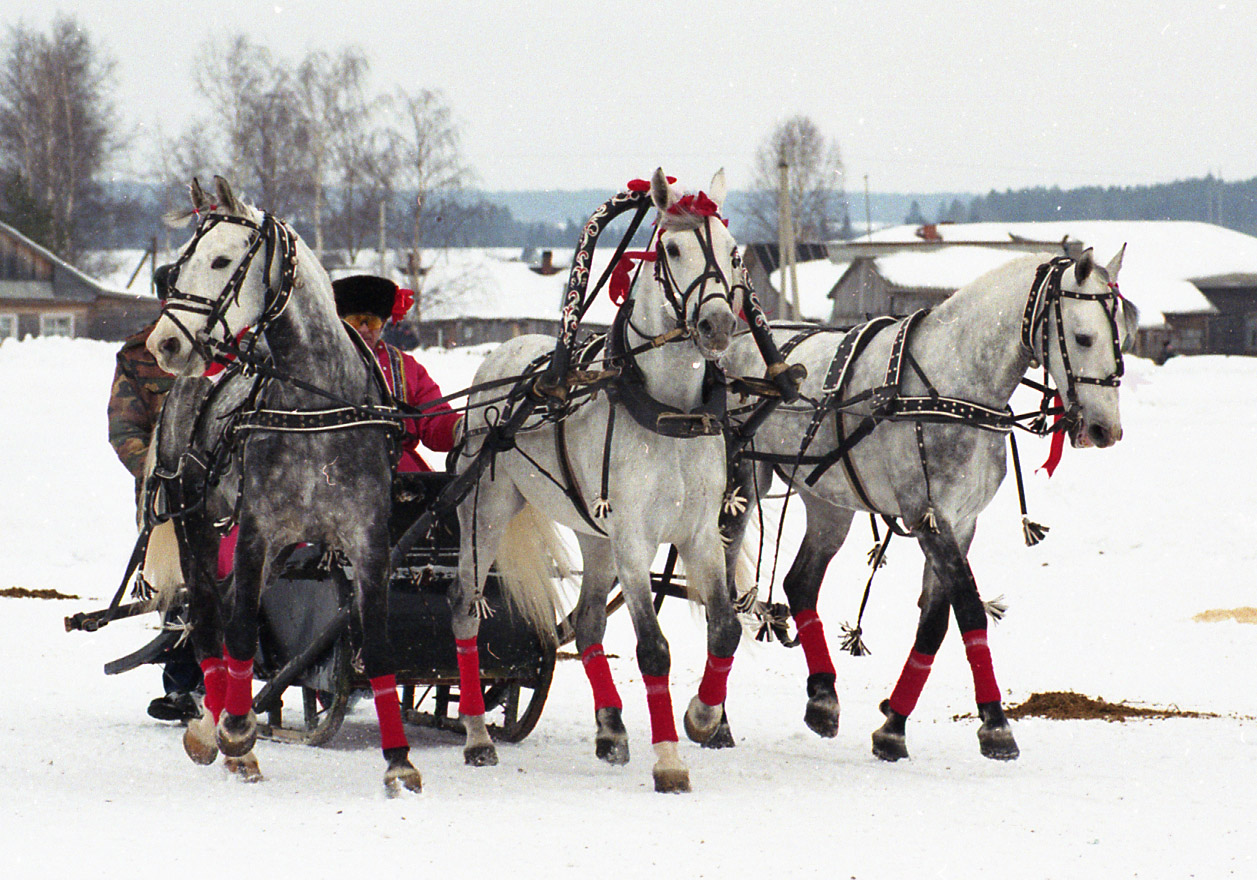
A racing troika, with the middle horse wearing a horse collar and shaft bow, and the side horses in breastcollar harness

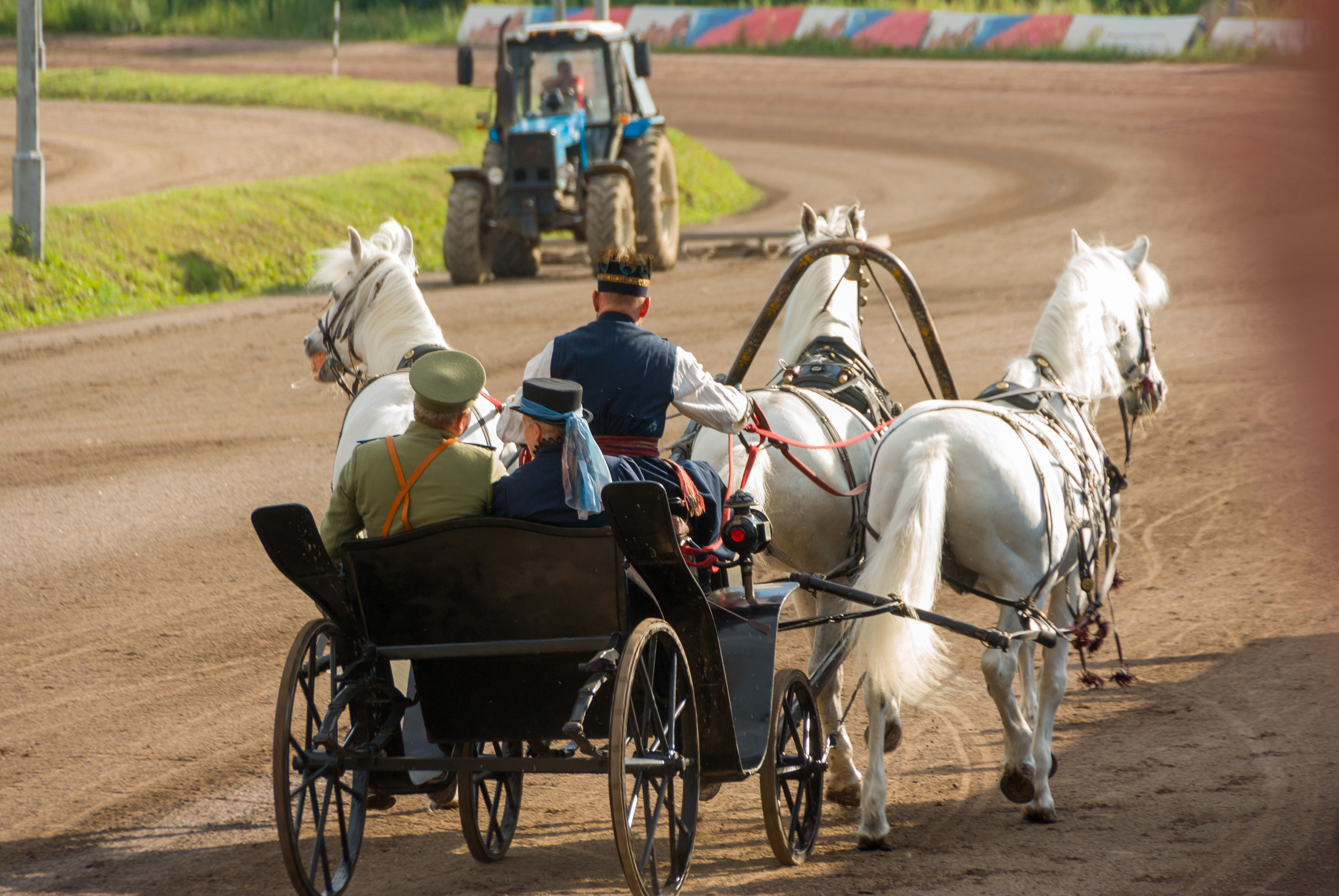
A racing troika-harnessed cart

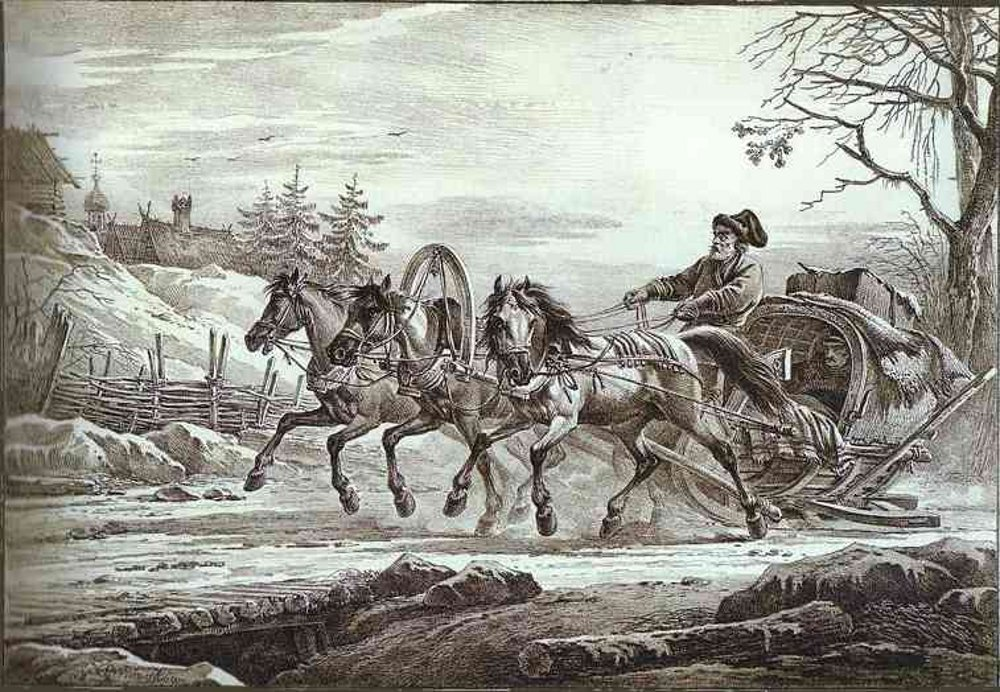
Travel in a Kibitka by Aleksander Orłowski, 1819

A troika (Russian: тройка, "triplet" or "trio") is a high-speed Russian harness driving combination, using three horses abreast. In a common perception, a troika is pulling a sleigh, but this type of harness may also be used for wheeled carriages.

== Overview ==
The troika differs from most other three-horse combinations in that the horses are harnessed abreast. The middle horse is usually harnessed in a horse collar and shaft bow; the side horses are usually in breastcollar harness. The troika is traditionally driven so that the middle horse trots and the side horses canter; the right-hand horse will be on the right lead and the left-hand horse on the left lead. The troika is often claimed to be the world's only harness combination with different gaits of the horses.

The term "troika" is sometimes used to refer to any three-horse team harnessed abreast, regardless of harness style or what horse-drawn vehicle is used.

At full speed a troika can reach 45–50 kilometres per hour (28–31 mph), which was a very high land speed for vehicles in the 17th–19th centuries, making the troika closely associated with a fast ride.

The troika was developed in Russia during the 17th century, first being used for speedy mail delivery, and then becoming common by the late 18th century. It was used for travelling in stages, where teams of tired horses could be exchanged for fresh animals to transport loads over long distances. Prior to this time, only groups of three or more people could use three horses, and a single person or two people had the right to only drive a single horse or a pair.

During the Russian Empire, the upper classes would use a troika driven by a livery-clad postilion. Decorated troikas were popular in major religious celebrations and weddings.

The troika was a part of both urban and rural culture. The horses usually driven in a troika were generally plain and rather small; for example the Vyatka horse was not taller than 14.1 hands (57 inches, 145 cm). However, the wealthy preferred to use the elegant Orlov Trotter.

The first troika competitions were held in the Moscow hippodrome in 1840. The troika was also exhibited at the 1911 Festival of Empire in London.

== Cultural icon ==
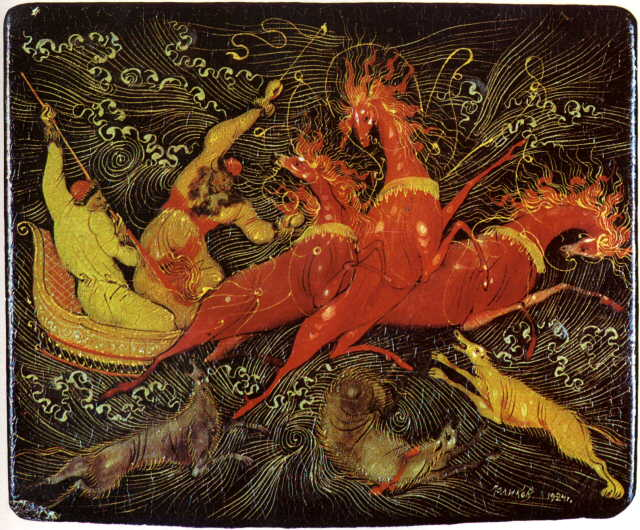
Troika of wolves, an example of Palekh miniature.

The troika has become a cultural icon of Russia, especially after it was featured in a scene of Nikolay Gogol's novel Dead Souls, where a character marvels at a troika speeding through the vast expanses of Russia (Oh troika, winged troika, tell me who invented you?). The person carried by Gogol's troika – Chichikov, the protagonist of the novel – is a fraudster buying "dead souls" (ownership of dead serfs whose deaths had not yet been registered by population censuses) with the intent of taking out a loan against them. The irony of the iconic Russian troika being the bearer of a swindler has been discussed in Vasily Shukshin's short story Started Skidding ("Забуксовал").

The 1934 Russian film Lieutenant Kijé portrays a wild ride on a troika, accompanied by music by Sergei Prokofiev. Prokofiev later expanded his score into the Lieutenant Kijé orchestral suite; the "Troika" movement in particular has been reused in many popular works.

== See also ==
- Sled/sleigh
- Trigarium
- Glossary of Russian horse-drawn vehicles
- Horses in Russia
- Vladimir Zhirinovsky's donkey video
