= Vladimir Zhirinovsky's donkey video =

Election video

Zhirinovsky's own presidential election video, featuring him on a sleigh, which was harnessed with a black donkey

On 6 February 2012, Vladimir Zhirinovsky, the former far-right populist leader of the nationalist Liberal Democratic Party of Russia, released a 30-second election video on the Internet that featured him on a sleigh which was harnessed with a black donkey. Zhirinovsky later claimed he owned the animal and that the animal was named Proshka (Russian: Прошка, diminutive from Prokhor), after Mikhail Prokhorov, another candidate in the 2012 Russian presidential election. The video was named "Troika" at the official site of the LDPR, but was distributed on YouTube under the title: "Zhirinovsky beats donkey!".

In the video, Zhirinovsky claimed that the "little wretched donkey" is the symbol of Russia and that if he were to become President a "daring troika" would return as a symbol of the country, which "got stuck" at one place just as the donkey. After this, Zhirinovsky whipped the animal to move the sleigh across the snow-covered backyard of his dacha.

Animal welfare and rights organizations accused Zhirinovsky of cruelty to animals in relation to this advertisement. Zhirinovsky was also accused of disdain towards the people of Russia. The video became a subject of wide discussion in the Runet and the Russian media, including presidential TV debates and comedy shows involving Zhirinovsky.

== Background ==
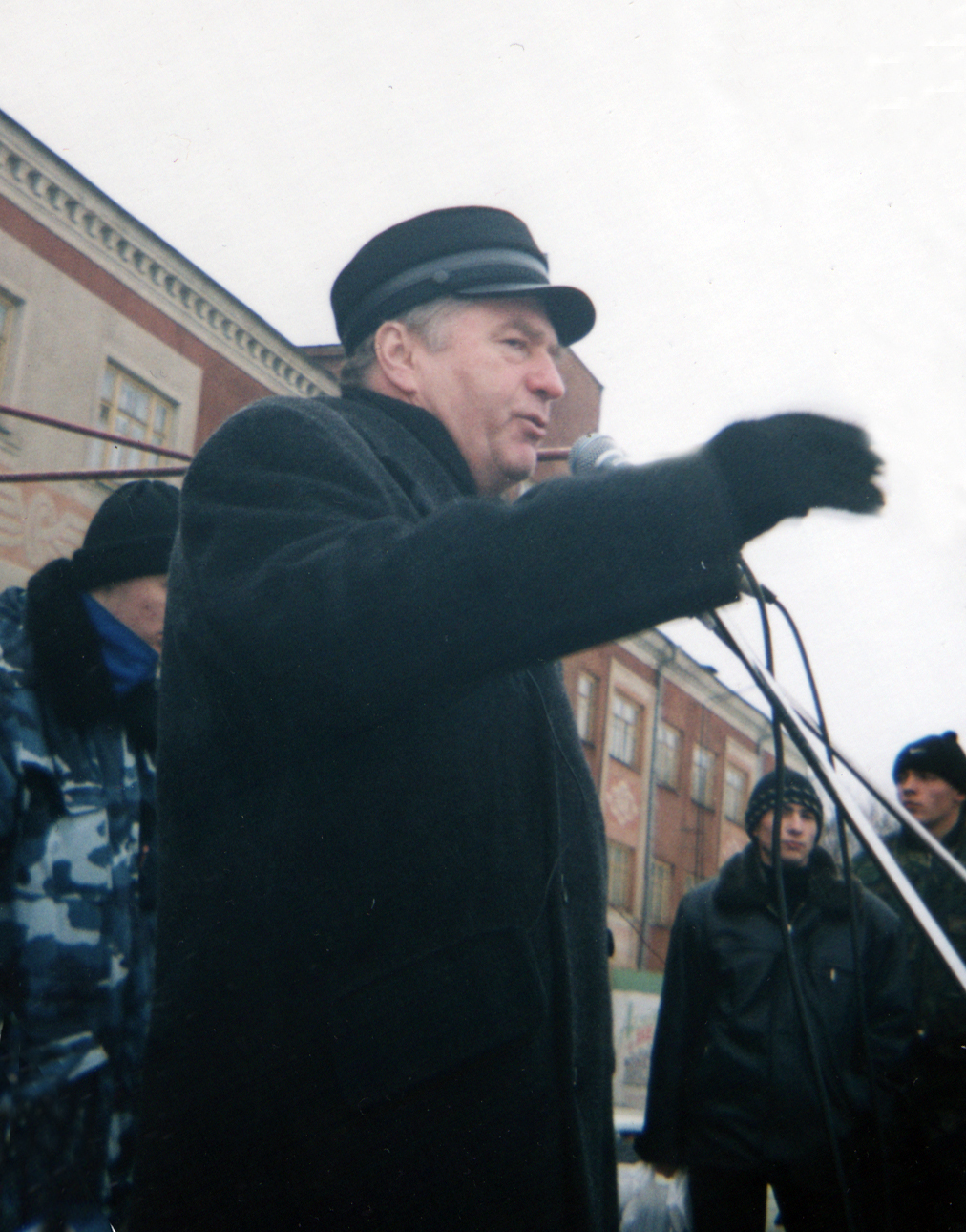
Zhirinovsky speaking publicly in Rtishchevo in 1999

Vladimir Volfovich Zhirinovsky, born in 1946, was a veteran of Russian politics who participated in five Russian presidential elections. He was the founder and long-standing leader of the Liberal Democratic Party of Russia. Despite its name and its proclaimed centrist and reformist outlook, the party is frequently described as "neither liberal nor democratic." It is usually regarded as far-right and is identified with Russian ultranationalism, right-wing populism, or national populism and conservatism. Its ideology is based primarily on Zhirinovsky's ideas of "imperial reconquest" (a "renewed Russian Empire") and authoritarian vision of a 'Greater Russia.'"

Zhirinovsky was "often viewed as something of a clown" and "a showman of Russian politics, blending populist and nationalist rhetoric, anti-Western invective and a brash, confrontational style". His campaign slogan for 2012 was "Vote Zhirinovsky, or things will get worse".

Eventually, in the 2012 Russian presidential election, Zhirinovsky was fourth with 6.22% of the votes, behind Prokhorov, who received 7.94%.

== Content, controversy, discussions, and secondary usage ==
The thirty second video was released on the Internet on 6 February 2012, as a part of Zhirinovsky's election campaign. The video is titled "Troika" at the official site of the Liberal Democratic Party of Russia.

In the video, Zhirinovsky is seen wearing a black fur coat and a black ushanka hat, and sits in a sleigh harnessed with the black donkey. Zhirinovsky begins to speak, claiming that the "little wretched donkey is the symbol of Russia" and that if he, Zhirinovsky, would become the President, a "daring troika" would return as a symbol of Russia. While making the proclamation, Zhirinovsky whips the animal. As the donkey does not immediately pull, Zhirinovsky shouts "It cannot move.... The whole country got stuck...." and continually shouts "Go! Go! Go!" while furiously whipping the animal into moving across the snow-covered backyard of his dacha. A voice-over concludes the video: "Zhirinovsky – it will get better!"

The video was widely discussed on the Internet. It received mostly negative reactions from Russian users. The video also featured on Channel One's comedy show Yesterday Live on 17 March 2012, as part of a spoof news clip from a fictitious US-based TV channel, reporting that, in Russia, there was a shortage of gasoline, with people abandoning cars and resorting to other modes of transportation.

== Symbolism ==
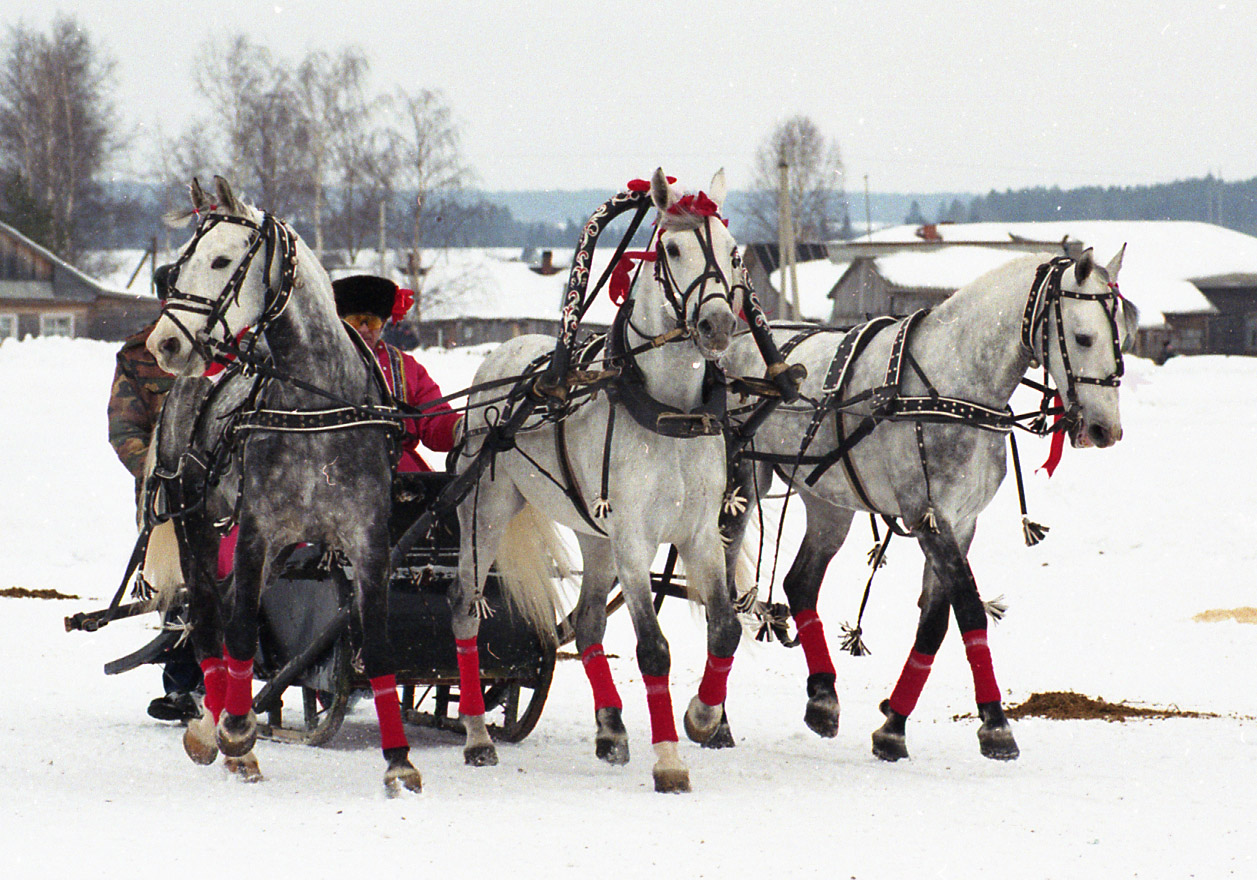
A troika, a traditional Russian icon which Zhirinovsky has controversially replaced with a donkey in his video.

Zhirinovsky referred to an explanation of the origin of troika in a televised election debate with Natalya Narochnitskaya. The Troika has become a cultural icon of Russia, especially after it was featured in a scene of Nikolay Gogol's novel Dead Souls, where a "troika-bird" rides through the vast expanses of Russia. Narochnitskaya accused Zhirinovsky of disdain towards the people of Russia, as well as projecting pessimism and aggression through this video. Zhirinovsky replied that the video is an allegory of what the rulers of Russia had made with the country in the last hundred years.

=== Naming of the donkey ===
Zhirinovsky stated during a televised election debate with Gennady Zyuganov, another presidential candidate, that the animal seen in the video is called Proshka. Proshka is the diminutive form of the Greek and Slavic name Prokhor; Zhirinovsky stated that the animal is named after Russian presidential candidate, Mikhail Prokhorov. Later Zhirinovsky confirmed the donkey's name as "Proshka, Prokhor" when he participated as a guest in the comedy talk show Prozhektorperiskhilton on Channel One TV.

This incident did not mark the first time Zhirinovsky named a domestic animal after a rival politician. In the same Prozhektorperiskhilton show, Zhirinovsky also said that he once owned a male sheep called "Ben", which was named after the initials of Russian politician, Boris Efimovich Nemtsov, another political opponent.

== Allegations of animal cruelty ==
According to Zhirinovsky, the animal featured in the video was his own – a present given to him on his 60th birthday. He said that it is kept on his dacha land, and has not been used for any work for the last five years. The animal is claimed by Zhirinovsky to be well-fed, to have separate lodgings, and to live in conditions found "nowhere in the world".

International organizations People for the Ethical Treatment of Animals (PETA) and World Society for the Protection of Animals (Now known as World Animal Protection), as well as Russian animal rights activists, have accused Zhirinovsky of cruelty to animals. Zhirinovsky responded to criticism, saying that similar treatment is commonplace in the Arab world, and that in fact, the animal has been treated "better than many people".

The Central Electoral Commission of Russia commented that there is no regulation on whether and how presidential candidates could use animals in propaganda, but that if the candidates do so, they should take all the risks connected with that.
