= Gavriil Ilizarov =

Soviet physician (1921–1992)

Gavriil Yelizarov Гавриил Абрамович Илизаров
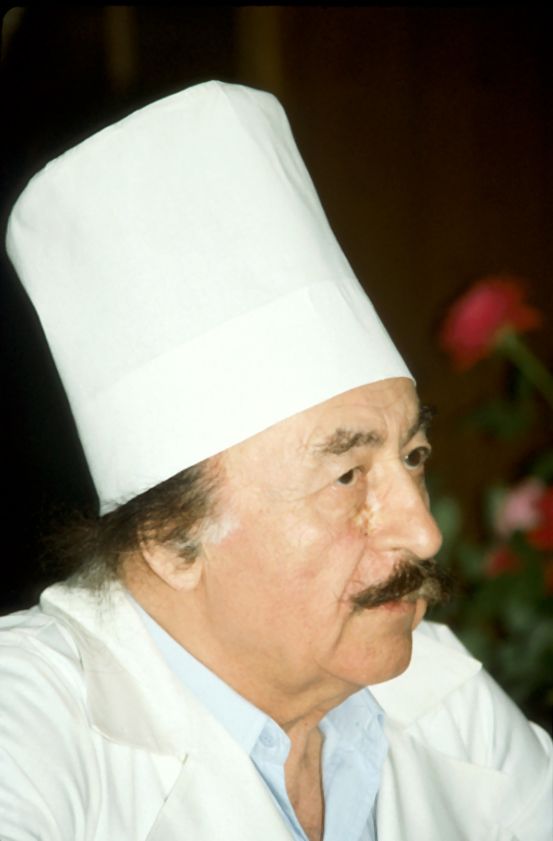
- Ilizarov in 1991
- Born: 15 June 1921; Białowieża, Białystok Voivodeship, Poland
- Died: 24 July 1992 (aged 71); Kurgan, Kurgan Oblast, Russian Federation
- Education: Crimean Medical Institute
- Known for: Ilizarov apparatus for lengthening limb bones
- Medical career
- Profession: Surgeon, Physician
- Institutions: KNIIEKOT
- Sub-specialties: Orthopedic surgery
Awards
Order of Lenin	Order of Lenin	Order of Lenin	Order of the Red Banner of Labour
Lenin Prize (1979)

Gavriil Abramovich Ilizarov (Russian: Гаврии́л Абра́мович Илиза́ров; 15 June 1921 – 24 July 1992) was a Soviet physician, known for inventing the Ilizarov apparatus for lengthening limb bones and for the method of surgery named after him, the Ilizarov surgery.

== Life and work ==
Ilizarov was born the eldest of six children to a poor Jewish family in Białowieża, Białystok Voivodeship, Republic of Poland.

In 1928, the family moved to the parents of his father in the town of Qusar in Azerbaijan Soviet Socialist Republic, near Qırmızı Qəsəbə. His father, Abram Ilizarov, was a Mountain Jew from Qusar, while his mother, Golda Ilizarova, was of Ashkenazi Jewish ancestry. In 1939, he graduated from Buynaksk Medical Rabfak, an educational establishment set up to prepare workers and peasants for higher education, and he entered the Crimean Medical Institute in Simferopol. After the outbreak of the German–Soviet War in 1941, the school was evacuated to Kyzylorda in Kazakhstan.

After finishing school in 1944, Ilizarov was sent to a rural hospital in Dolgovka, a village in Kurgan Oblast in Siberia, 2000 km east of Moscow. In 1950, he obtained a position within a General Surgery Department of the Kurgan Regional Hospital, which included a duty as a surgeon with the air ambulance. In 1955, he became Chief of the Department of Trauma and Orthopaedics in the Regional Hospital for War Veterans in Kurgan.

=== Bone experiments ===
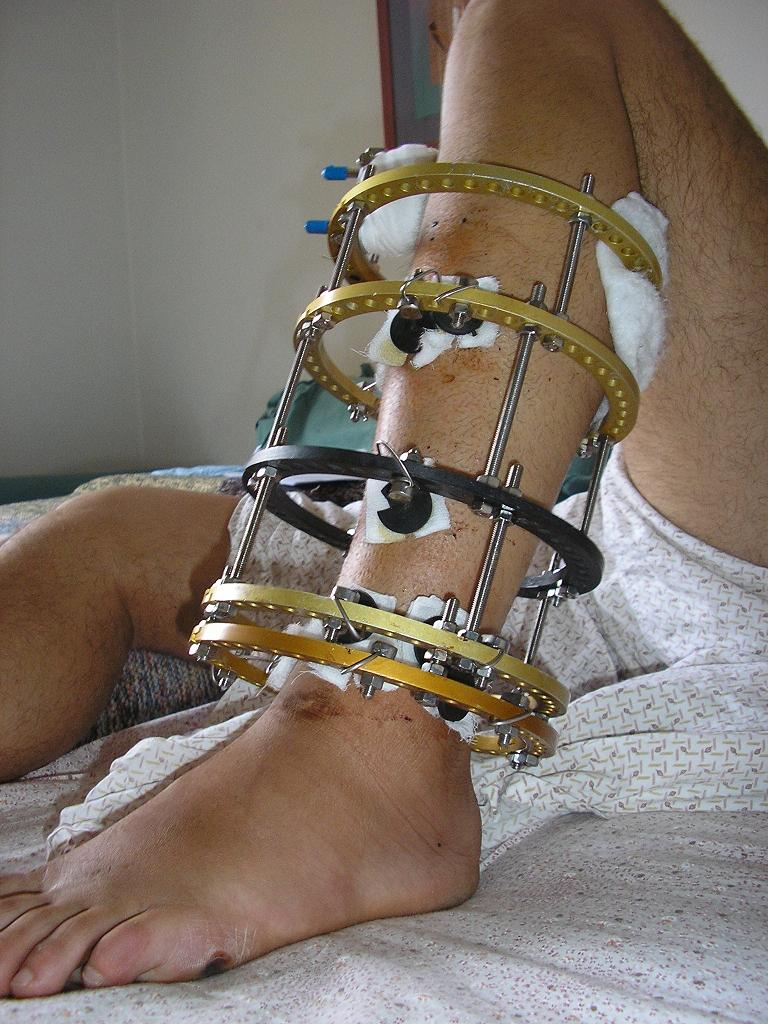
An Ilizarov apparatus treating a fractured tibia and fibula

Ilizarov's residency was carried out in orthopedic surgery, during which he developed an external fixator system in 1951. He discovered that by carefully severing a bone without severing the periosteum around it, one could separate two halves of a bone slightly and fix them in place, and the bone would grow to fill the gap. He also discovered that bone regrows at a fairly uniform rate across people and circumstances. These experiments led to the design of what is known as an Ilizarov apparatus, which holds a bone so severed in place, by virtue of a framework and pins through the bone, and separates halves of the bone by a tiny amount; by repeating this over time, at the rate of the bone's regrowth, it is possible to extend a bone by a desired amount. Originally, bicycle parts were used for the frame. The procedure was inspired by a shaft bow harness on a horse carriage.

For long time, Ilizarov faced skepticism, resistance, and political intrigues from the medical establishment in Moscow, which tried to defame him as a quack. The steadily increasing statistics of successful treatments of patients led to a growing fame of Ilizarov throughout the country, and he became known among patients as "the magician from Kurgan". In 1968, Ilizarov defended his doctoral thesis in Perm and was awarded the title Doctor of Sciences bypassing the Candidate of Sciences degree for which the thesis had originally been prepared. A breakthrough came in 1968, when Ilizarov successfully operated on Valeriy Brumel, the 1964 Olympic champion and a long-time world record holder in the men's high jump, who injured his right leg in a motorcycle accident. Before coming to Ilizarov, Brumel spent about three years for unsuccessful treatments in various clinics and underwent seven invasive and 25 non-invasive surgeries.

=== Ilizarov Center ===
In 1971, the Kurgan Research Institute for Experimental and Clinical Orthopaedics and Traumatology (KNIIEKOT) was established in Kurgan. In the center, the Ilizarov method of transosseous osteosynthesis is applied to lengthen or reshape limb bones. Ilizarov was the head of this center until 1991. With about 1,000 beds, 24 operating rooms, and 168 employed physicians, KNIIEKOT became the largest orthopedic clinic in the world.

After his death, KNIIEKOT was renamed the Russian Ilizarov Scientific Center for Restorative Traumatology and Orthopaedics (RISC RTO). The staff includes ten professors, 34 Doctors of Sciences, and 193 Candidates of Sciences. The RISC RTO comprises an outpatient clinic where 250 patients can be consulted daily, a hospital with 800 beds, an experimental department, and animal surgery. Every year, over 9,000 people undergo treatment at the RISC RTO.

=== International recognition ===
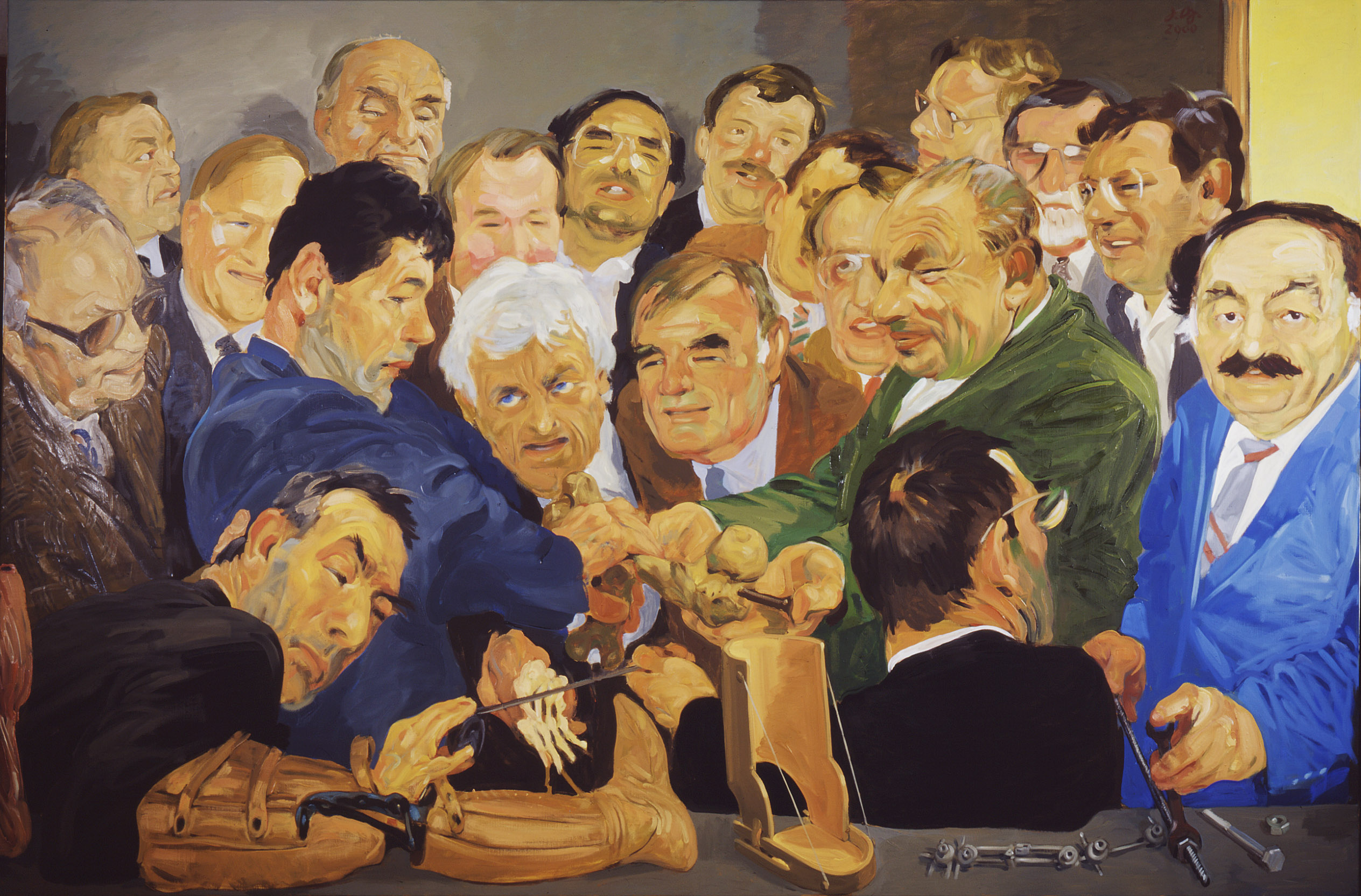
Küntscher and Ilizarov

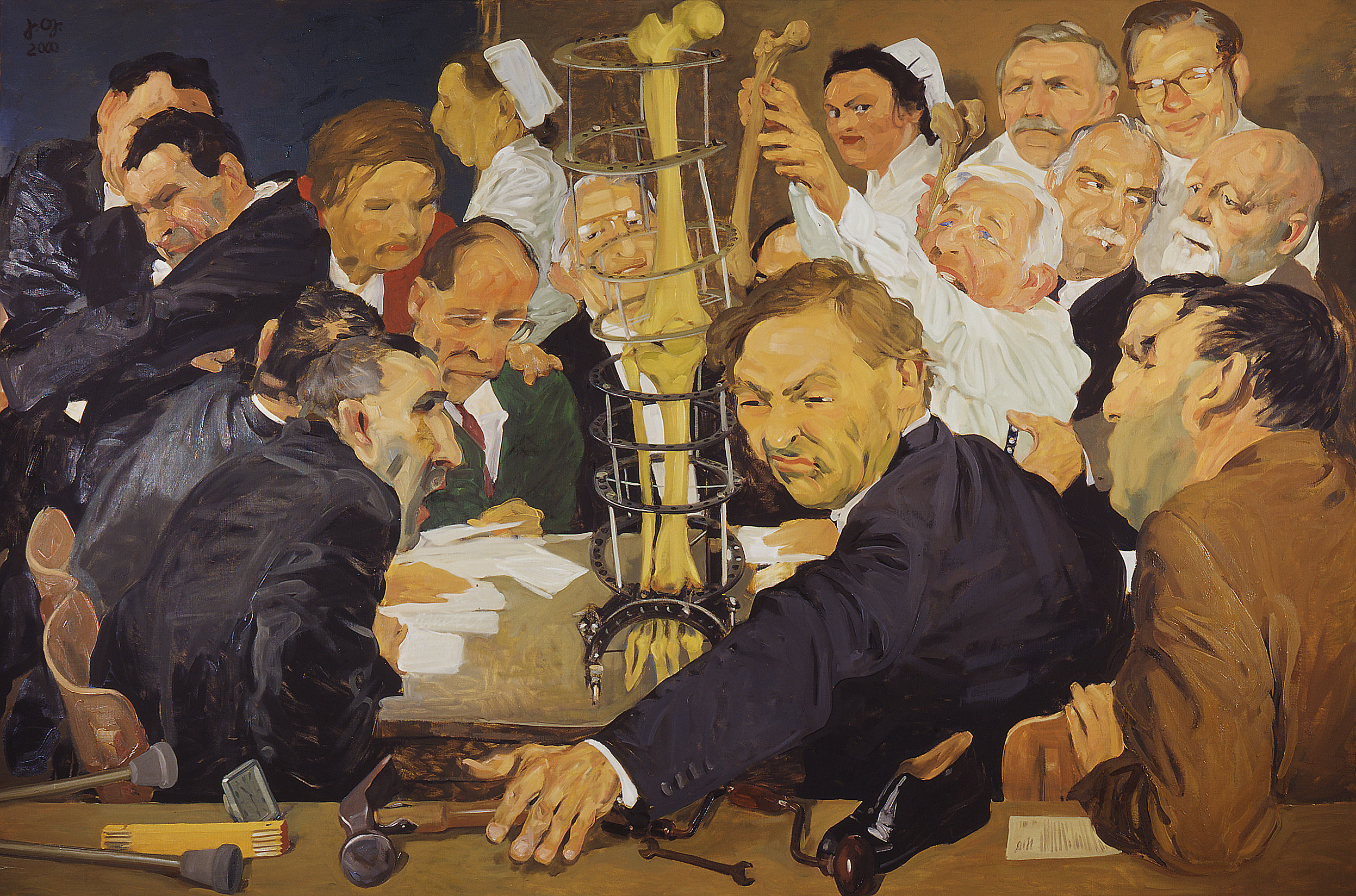
Ilizarov fixator

Wall paintings by Johannes Grützke in the lecture hall of BGUK, Hamburg

Scattered reports about the successful treatment of Brumel by Ilizarov appeared in the Western press during the Cold War era. The first foreign medical visitor was Johannes Hellinger from the former GDR, Medical Academy of Erfurt in 1970. He made a first publication in a Western medical journal about the Ilizarov Method.

In 1980, Carlo Mauri, an Italian mountaineer, explorer, and photojournalist, on the urgings of his Russian colleague Yuri Senkevich, travelled to Kurgan, in the Soviet Union. He was to be treated by Ilizarov for a tibial fracture that healed incorrectly after a skiing accident ten years earlier. Italian doctors had long given up hope of any surgical improvement to the leg. Ilizarov distracted the stiff non-union in his tibia by 2 cm, healing the pseudarthrosis, corrected an equinus deformity by distraction and lengthened his leg. Mauri dubbed Ilizarov "the Michelangelo of Orthopaedics". On his return to Italy, the healing of Mauri's leg amazed orthopaedic surgeons. Subsequent to this, Ilizarov was invited by Antonio Bianchi-Maiocchi and Roberto Cattaneo to be a guest speaker at the AO Italy conference in 1981 in Bellagio. He gave three lectures at the conferences to more than 200 participants from Italy, France, Switzerland, Austria, and Germany. At the end of the lectures, Ilizarov earned a ten-minute standing ovation. This was the first time Ilizarov spoke outside of the Iron Curtain.

In 1982, the Association for the Study and Application of the Methods of Ilizarov (ASAMI) was formed in Italy. In 1983, Medicalplastic, a company owned by Bianchi-Maiocchi, licensed the technique from the Soviet authorities, registered the ILIZAROV trademark, and started to produce and market the Ilizarov apparatus. In the following years, the Ilizarov method has spread rapidly through most of Western Europe. ASAMI organised courses in Italy, Portugal, Switzerland, France, Spain, Greece, Brazil, and the United States. ASAMI groups were formed in France, Spain, Belgium, Portugal and Brazil.

In 1986–1987, the technique was brought to North America by Drs. Victor Frankel, president of Hospital for Joint Diseases, Dror Paley, Alfred D. Grant, and Stuart Green who, in 1992, edited the first English translation of Ilizarov's book. Over 300 American orthopaedic surgeons attended an international symposium organised in 1987 in New York by the Hospital for Joint Diseases and the Smith & Nephew company to hear the lectures by Ilizarov. Smith & Nephew started the distribution of the Ilizarov external fixator in the USA and worldwide.

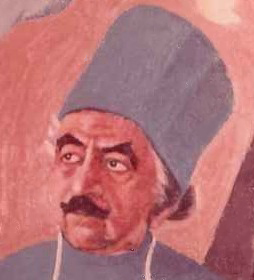
Fragment of a 1988 portrait of Ilizarov by Israel Tsvaygenbaum

In 1989, an Ilizarov conference was organised by Dietmar Wolter in Hamburg. In 1990, Ilizarov came to the second conference in Hamburg, where he co-founded the German Ilizarov Society (Deutsche Ilisarow-Gesellschaft). The hospital of the German Accident Prevention & Insurance Association (Berufsgenossenschaftliches Unfallkrankenhaus, BGUK) in Boberg, Hamburg-Lohbrügge, became a major center in Germany applying and promoting the Ilizarov technique. It also became compulsory for all senior physicians of the hospital to visit the Kurgan Center for learning the Ilizarov method.

=== Later life and death ===
The opposition by the Moscow medical establishment continued until the last years of Ilizarov's life. As late as 1991, just one year before his death, Ilizarov was elected a full member of the Russian Academy of Sciences. Despite numerous awards and the worldwide recognition, he was not elected to the USSR Academy of Medical Sciences.

Ilizarov died of heart failure in 1992, at the age of 71.

== Awards and honours (selected) ==
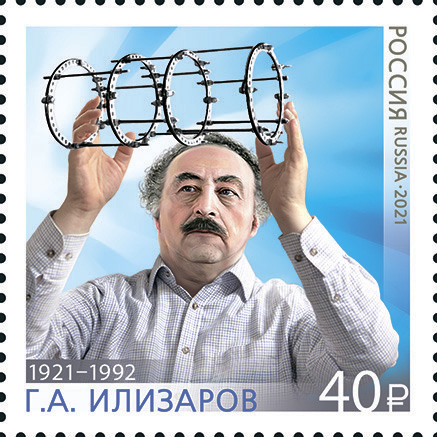
Ilizarov with his apparatus on a 2021 stamp of Russia

=== Soviet and Russian ===
- Honoured Medical Doctor of RSFSR (1965)
- Order of the Red Banner (1966)
- Honorary citizen of Kurgan (1971)
- Lenin Prize (1978)
- Hero of Socialist Labour (1981)
- Honoured Inventor of the USSR (1985)
- Order of Lenin (3 times)
- Full member of the Russian Academy of Sciences (1991)

=== International ===
- Order of the Smile (1978)
- Commander of the Order of Merit of the Italian Republic (1984)
- Order of Independence (Jordan, 1985)
- Order of the Polar Star (Mongolia, 1985)
- Order of the Yugoslav Flag with Golden Wreath (1987)
- Robert Danis Prize of the International Society of Surgery (1987)
- Honorary citizen of Milan, Lecco, Rufina, Florence, and Nancy
- A minor planet 3750 Ilizarov was named after him in 1982

== Legacy ==
- Ilizarov Street in the settlement of Kommunarka, within the Novomoskovsky Administrative Okrug of Moscow, was named on 21 October 2021.
- Ilizarov Street in the 6th microdistrict of the Zaozyorny residential area in the city of Kurgan.
- Ilizarov Street in the city of Qusar, Azerbaijan.
- In September 1988, Israel Tsvaygenbaum traveled to Kurgan, where he spent six days with Gavriil Ilizarov, making preliminary sketches at his workplace.
- In 1993, the Russian Scientific Center for Restorative Traumatology and Orthopaedics (RSC RTO) was named after Academician G. A. Ilizarov. It is now known as the Russian Ilizarov Scientific Center for Restorative Traumatology and Orthopaedics, a federal state budgetary institution under the Ministry of Health of the Russian Federation (National Medical Research Center for Traumatology and Orthopedics named after Academician G. A. Ilizarov).
- In 2012, the Derbent Medical College in Dagestan was named after G. A. Ilizarov.
- In June 2021, President of the Russian Federation V. V. Putin signed a decree naming Kurgan Airport after G. A. Ilizarov.
- On 15 June 1993, the Museum of the History of the Development of the G. A. Ilizarov Russian Scientific Center for Restorative Traumatology and Orthopaedics was opened on the initiative of the centre's director general, V. I. Shevtsov.
- The G. A. Ilizarov Foundation was established in 1993.
- On 9 September 1994, a monument to Academician G. A. Ilizarov, founder of the centre and developer of the Ilizarov method, was unveiled on the grounds of the Russian Scientific Center for Restorative Traumatology and Orthopaedics. The monument was sculpted by Yu. L. Chernov.
- In 2012, a GAZ-13 Chaika automobile that had belonged to G. A. Ilizarov was installed as a monument near the Museum of the History of the G. A. Ilizarov Centre.
- A memorial plaque is located on the building at 41 Klimova Street in Kurgan, where G. A. Ilizarov lived from 1974 to 1992. A new memorial plaque was installed on 29 August 2019.
- Since 1995, the scientific and practical journal Genius of Orthopaedics has been published in memory of G. A. Ilizarov.
- In 2011, various Russian envelopes dedicated to G. A. Ilizarov were issued.
- In June 2021, the Russian Post issued a postage stamp commemorating G. A. Ilizarov, with a face value of 40 rubles and a print run of 144,000 copies.
- On 15 June 2021, a special first-day cancellation was held in Moscow to mark the centenary of G. A. Ilizarov's birth.
- In 2011, director Andrey Romanov made a documentary film entitled He Devoted His Life to People in Kurgan. The film was dedicated to the 90th anniversary of G. A. Ilizarov's birth. It received the Mayor of Kamensk-Uralsky M. S. Astakhov Award at the Third International Tourism Film Festival A Date with Russia, held in Verkhoturye and Kamensk-Uralsky in 2012.
- In 2016, Kurgan Oblast designated the year as the Year of Ilizarov.
- In 2023, the CompactTV film studio's Multi History project released an animated film about Gavriil Ilizarov.
