= Derbent Medical College =

Derbent college, located in the city of Derbent, Dagestan

Gavriil Ilizarov Derbent Medical College
- Дербентский медицинский колледж имени Г. А. Илизарова
- Former name: Derbent Medical School (1953-2014)
- Type: Secondary vocational educational institution
- Established: 1 October 1953; 73 years ago
- Location: Derbent, Russia; 42°01′18″N 48°19′49″E
- Campus: urban
- Language: Russian
- Website: dmk-derbent.ru

Derbent Medical College (Russian: Дербентский медицинский колледж имени Г. А. Илизарова; officially, State Budgetary Professional Educational Institution of the Republic of Dagestan, Derbent Medical College named after G. A. Ilizarov) is a secondary vocational educational institution located in the city of Derbent, Dagestan.

Address: 51 Sheboldaeva Street, Derbent, Dagestan, 368600, Russia.

== History ==
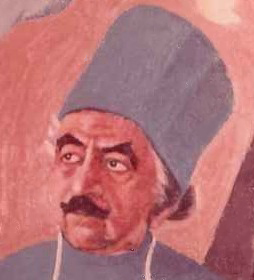
Fragment of a 1988 portrait of Gavriil Ilizarov by Israel Tsvaygenbaum

On October 1, 1953, the first paramedic school in Derbent was established at the city hospital, which was located on Buynaksky Street. Classes began on October 28 of the same year and were held in the hospital's basement.

Maritsa Savelyevna Tsagaraishvili became the school's first director while simultaneously serving as the director of the hospital. The first instructors were Anaida Grigoryevna Panuntseva (1893–1985) and Yan Gorgievich Sauridi (1925–1972).

The school's first enrollment consisted of 60 students, divided equally between two programs: midwifery and paramedic training, with 30 students in each program.

In 1992, pursuant to Resolution No. 256 of the Council of Ministers of the Republic of Dagestan dated November 16, 1992, “On Commemorating the Memory of G. A. Ilizarov,” the Derbent Medical School was named after G. A. Ilizarov. According to Order No. 204 of the Ministry of Health of the Republic of Dagestan dated November 26, 1992, the institution was henceforth to be known as the Dagestan Medical School named after G. A. Ilizarov.

On November 30, 2011, pursuant to Resolution No. 450 of the Government of the Republic of Dagestan, the institution was reorganized into the State Budgetary Educational Institution of Secondary Vocational Education of the Republic of Dagestan, “Derbent Medical School.”

On October 25, 2013, Derbent Medical College commemorated the 60th anniversary of the establishment of the medical school in Derbent and its naming after G. A. Ilizarov. As part of the anniversary celebrations, a memorial plaque dedicated to G. A. Ilizarov was unveiled on the wall of the academic building near its main entrance.

On July 22, 2014, pursuant to Resolution No. 333 of the Government of the Republic of Dagestan, the school was renamed the State Budgetary Professional Educational Institution of the Republic of Dagestan, “Derbent Medical College named after G. A. Ilizarov.”

From March 22 to March 27, 2021, the Derbent Medical College named after G.A. Ilizarov hosted the exhibition “Healing Art,” dedicated to the 100th anniversary of the birth of the legendary orthopedic surgeon G.A. Ilizarov.

== Educational activities ==
The Medical College provides training in six specialties:

- Dentistry
- Diagnosis
- Internal medicine
- Midwifery
- Nursing
- Pharmacy

The college's teaching staff includes instructors holding the highest and first qualification categories, as well as candidates of sciences (holders of the Russian Candidate of Sciences degree). Among the faculty members are recipients of honorary titles such as "Honored Physician," "Honored Teacher," "Honored Healthcare Worker," and "Excellence in Healthcare."

== Graduates ==
Graduates of Derbent Medical College work in healthcare institutions both within the Republic of Dagestan and beyond its borders, including in countries across the former Soviet Union and other parts of the world.
