= External fixation =

Surgical treatment procedure used to facilitate healing

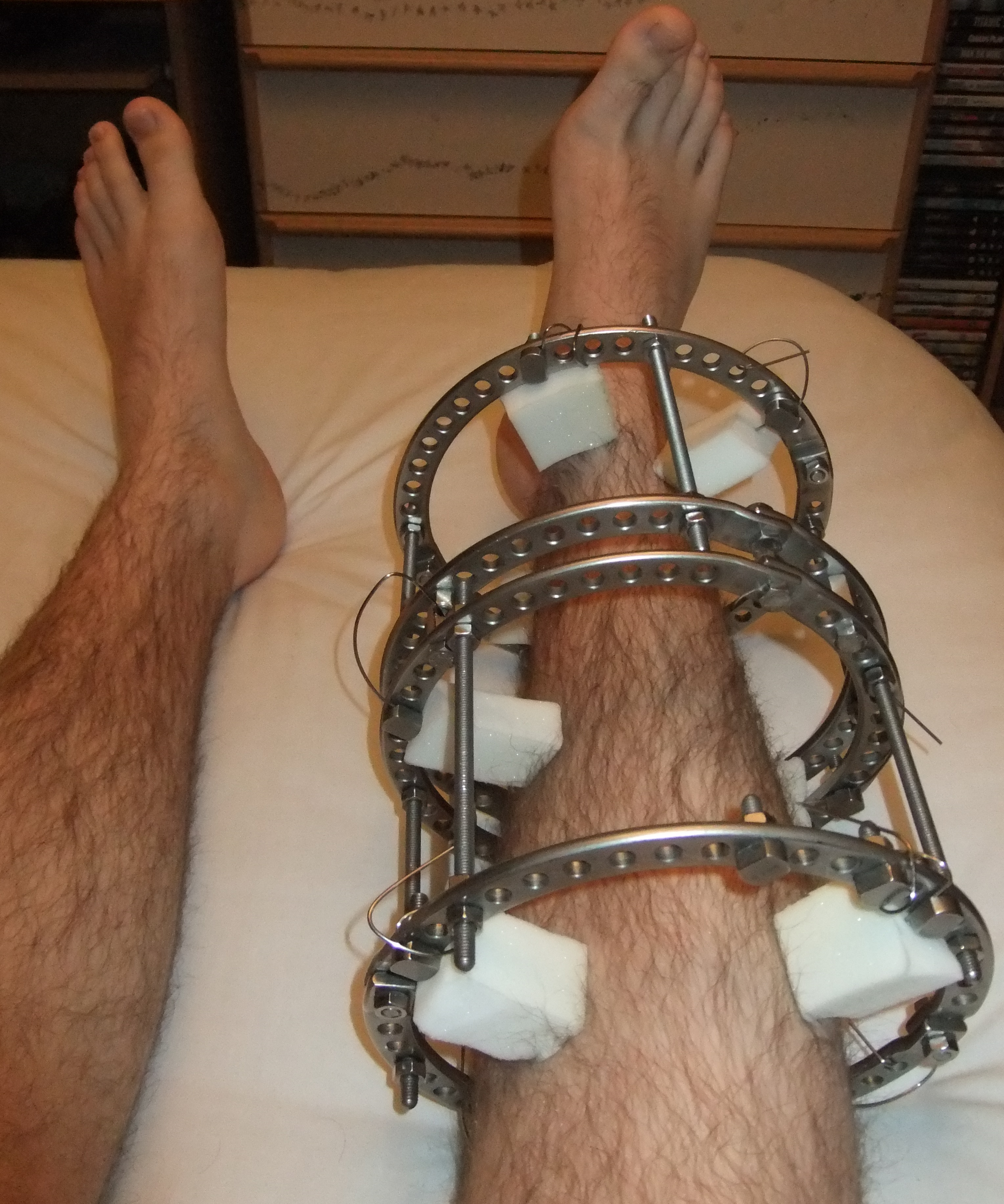
- An Ilizarov apparatus is a type of external fixation used to treat limb deformities.
- ICD-9-CM: 78.1, 79,93.51-93.56, 93.59
- MeSH: D016267

External fixation is a surgical treatment wherein Kirschner pins and wires are inserted and affixed into bone and then exit the body to be attached to an external apparatus composed of rings and threaded rods — the Ilizarov apparatus, the Taylor Spatial Frame, and the Octopod External Fixator — which immobilises the damaged limb to facilitate healing. As an alternative to internal fixation, wherein bone-stabilising mechanical components are surgically emplaced in the body of the patient, external fixation is used to stabilize bone tissues and soft tissues at a distance from the site of the injury.

== History ==
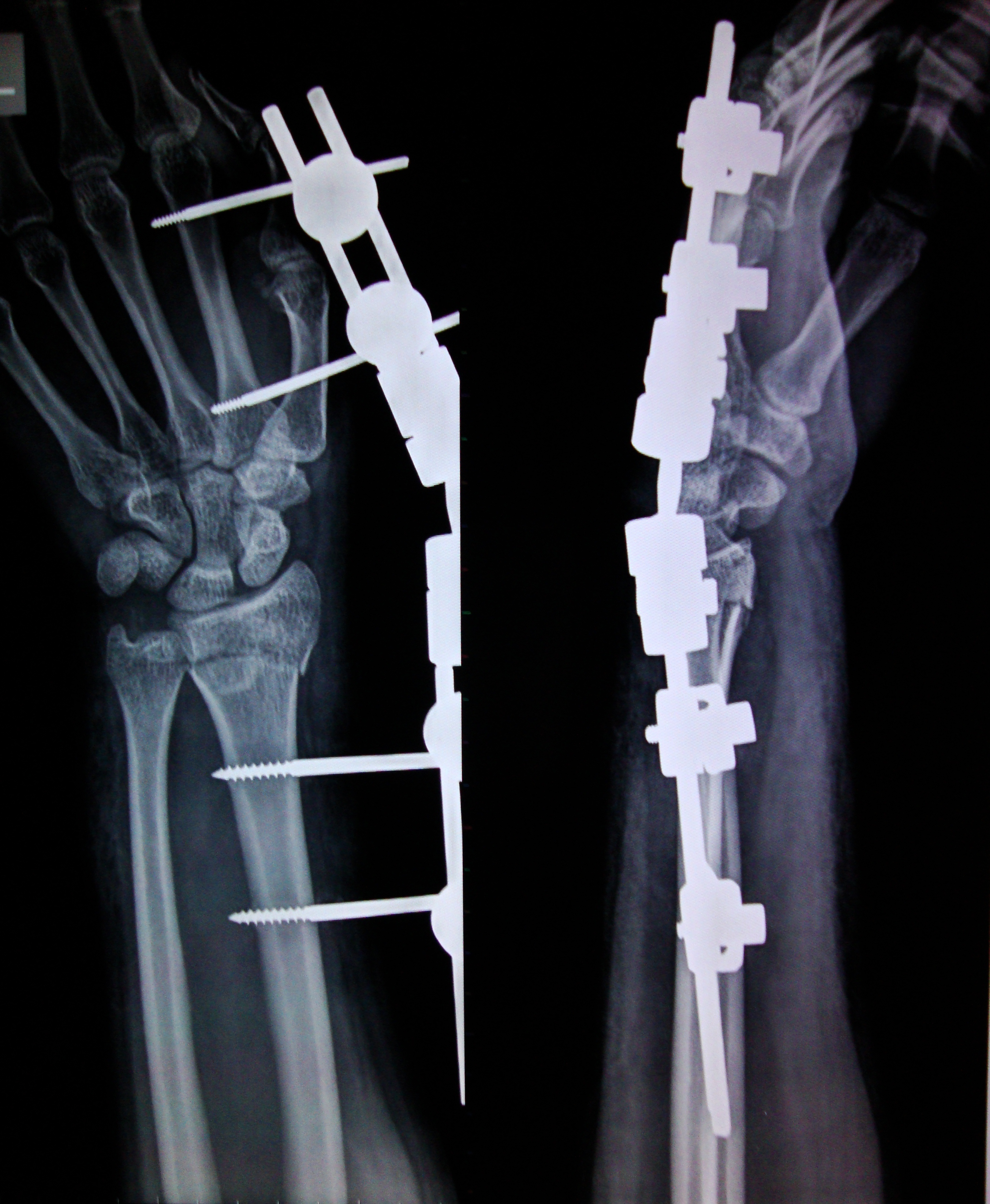
X-ray image of an external fixator being used to stabilise a Colles' fracture involving the Radius bone

In Classical Greece, the physician Hippocrates described an external fixation apparatus composed of leather rings connected with four wooden rods from a Cornel tree to splint the fracture of a tibia bone.

In 1840, Jean-Francois Malgaigne described a spike driven into the tibia and held by straps to immobilise a fractured tibia. In 1843 he used a claw-like device to percutaneously hold the fragments of a fractured patella.

Clayton Parkhill of Denver, Colorado and Albin Lambotte of Antwerp, Belgium independently invented the modern concept of unilateral external fixation, in 1894 and 1902, respectively. Lambotte was the first to use threaded pins; however, his device necessitated initial, open fracture reduction and then pin insertion and fixator placement.

In 1938, Raoul Hoffmann of Geneva, Switzerland, building on the work of others, realized that major improvements were essential to make the external fixator more clinically relevant. He developed a technique based on closed reduction with guided percutaneous pin placement. Hoffmann's technique exemplified the first application of minimally invasive orthopaedic surgery.

In the 1950s, in the USSR, Dr. Gavriil Ilizarov devised and developed and applied the Ilizarov apparatus for treating and resolving fractures, deformities, and defects of the bones of the limbs. A metal frame encircles the limb is attached to the underlying bone by crossing (X) pins inserted through the bone and limb. The external rings are linked to each other by threaded rods and hinges that allow to move the position of the bone fragments without opening the fracture site, then the fragments can be fixed in rigid position until complete healing.

== Method ==
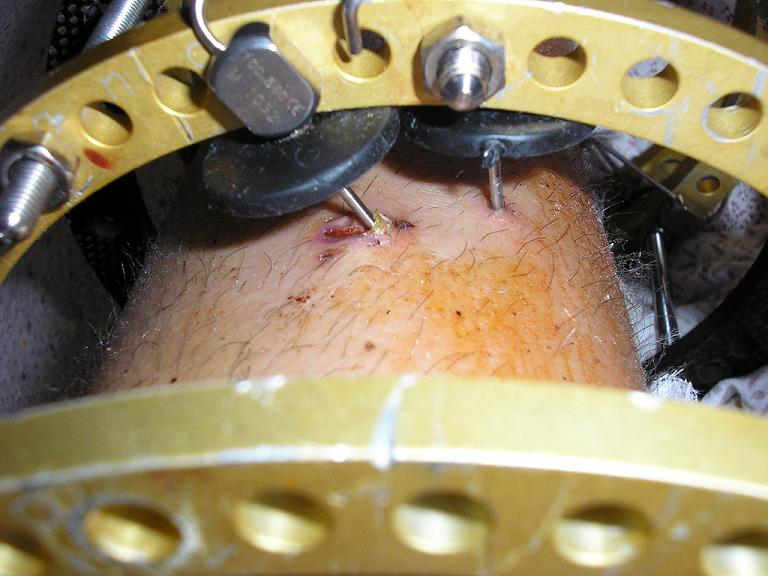
Kirschner pins immobilising the damaged limb

In this kind of reduction, holes are drilled into uninjured areas of bones around the fracture and special bolts or wires are screwed into the holes. Outside the body, a rod or a curved piece of metal with special ball-and-socket joints joins the bolts to make a rigid support. The fracture can be set in the proper anatomical configuration by adjusting the ball-and-socket joints. Since the bolts pierce the skin, proper cleaning to prevent infection at the site of surgery must be performed.

Installation of the external fixator is performed in an operating room, normally under general anesthesia. Removal of the external frame and bolts usually requires special wrenches and can be done with no anesthesia in an office visit.

External fixation is also used in limb lengthening. Typically, the bone is cut diagonally in a surgical procedure. External fixator pins or wires are placed on each side of the split and the external metal apparatus is used to very gradually pull the two sides of the bone apart over a long period of time. Bone will gradually grow into the small gap through distraction osteogenesis.

In most cases it may be necessary for the external fixator to be in place for many weeks or even months. Most fractures heal in between 6 and 12 weeks. However, in complicated fractures and where there are problems with the healing of the fracture this may take longer. It is known that bearing weight through fracture by walking on it, for example, with the added support of the external fixator frame actually helps fractures to heal.

The parts of an external fixator include:

1. Schanz pin
2. Connecting rods
3. Clamps

== Indications ==
1. Stabilization of severe open fractures
2. Stabilization of infected nonunions
3. Correction of extremity malalignments and length discrepancies
4. Initial stabilization of soft tissue and bony disruption in poly trauma patients (damage control orthopaedics)
5. Closed fracture with associated severe soft tissue injuries
6. Severely comminuted diaphyseal and periarticular lesions
7. Temporary transarticular stabilization of severe soft tissue and ligamentous injuries
8. Pelvic ring disruptions
9. Certain pediatric fractures
10. Arthrodesis
11. Ligamentotaxis
12. Osteotomies
13. Open fractures that have significant soft tissue disruption (e.g., type II or III open fractures)
14. Soft tissue injury (e.g., burns)
15. Acetabular and pelvic fractures
16. Severely comminuted and unstable fractures
17. Fractures that are associated with bony deficits
18. Limb-lengthening procedures
19. Fractures associated with infection or nonunion

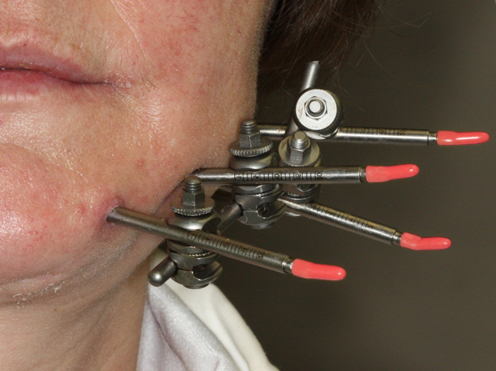
External fixation of the mandible

== Contraindications ==
1. Patient with compromised immune system
2. Non compliant patient who would not be able to ensure proper wire and pin care
3. Pre-existing internal fixation that prohibits proper wire or pin placement
4. Bone pathology precluding pin fixation

== Complications ==
1. Damage to soft-tissue structures - Transfixing pins or wires may injure nerves or vessels, or may tether ligaments and inhibit joint movement. The surgeon must be thoroughly familiar with the cross-sectional anatomy before operating.

2. Overdistraction - If there is no contact between the fragments, bone union is unlikely to occur.

3. Pin-track infection - This is less likely with good operative technique. Nevertheless, meticulous pinsite care is essential to avoid infection.

== Types ==
- Ilizarov apparatus
- Octopod External Fixator
- Taylor Spatial Frame

== See also ==
- Distraction osteogenesis
- Internal fixation
- Bone fracture
- Trauma surgery
- Traumatology
- AO Foundation
