= Ilizarov apparatus =

Type of external fixation (medical device)

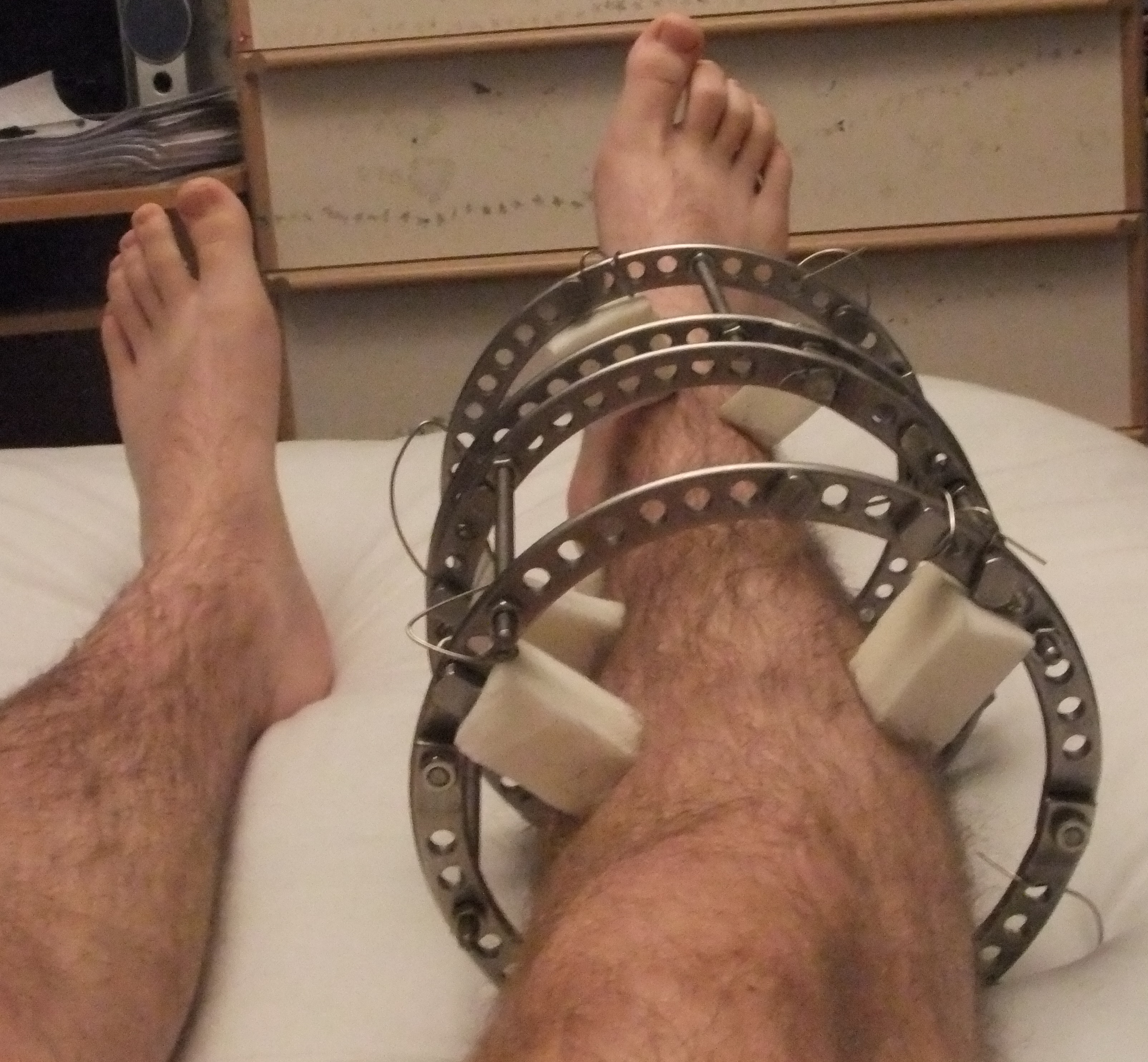
- An Ilizarov apparatus treatment for the fractured tibia and fibula bones of the right leg.
- ICD-9-CM: 78.3, 84.53
- MeSH: D018889
- [edit on Wikidata]

The Ilizarov apparatus is a type of external fixation apparatus used in orthopedic surgery to lengthen or to reshape the damaged bones of an arm or a leg; used as a limb-sparing technique for treating complex fractures and open bone fractures; and used to treat an infected non-union of bones, which cannot be surgically resolved. The Ilizarov apparatus corrects angular deformity in a leg, corrects differences in the lengths of the legs of the patient, and resolves osteopathic non-unions; further developments of the Ilizarov apparatus progressed to the development of the Taylor Spatial Frame.

Gavriil Abramovich Ilizarov developed the Ilizarov apparatus as a limb-sparing surgical remedy for the treatment of the osteopathic non-unions of patients with unhealed broken limbs. Consequent to a patient lengthening, rather than shortening, the adjustable-rod frame of his external-fixation apparatus, Ilizarov observed the formation of a fibrocartilage callus at and around the site of the bone fracture, and so discovered the phenomenon of distraction osteogenesis, the regeneration of bone and soft tissues that culminates in the creation of new bone.

In 1987, the Ilizarov apparatus and Ilizarov's surgical techniques for repairing the broken bones of damaged limbs were introduced to U.S. medicine. The mechanical functions of the Ilizarov apparatus derive from the mechanics of the shaft bow harness for a horse.

== The apparatus ==
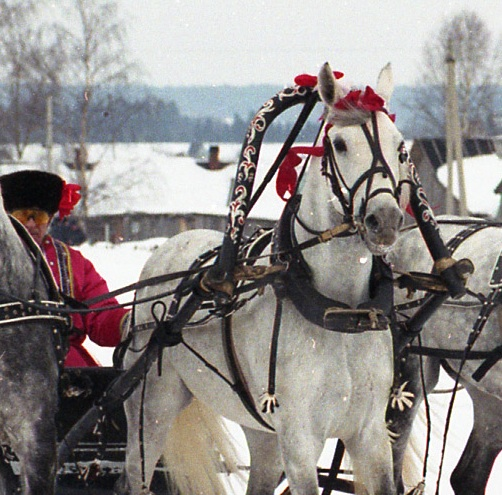
The mechanical functions of the Ilizarov apparatus derive from the tension mechanics of the shaft bow of a horse harness. (the decorated arch behind the head of the horse)

The Ilizarov apparatus is a specialized external fixator of modular construction, composed of rings (stainless steel, titanium) that are transfixed to healthy bone with Kirschner wires and pins of heavy-gauge stainless steel, and immobilised in place with additional rings and threaded rods that are attached with and through adjustable nuts. The circular construction of the apparatus, the rods, and the controlled tautness of the Kirschner wires immobilises the damaged limb to allow healing.

The mechanical functions of the Ilizarov apparatus are based upon the principles of tension (pulling force), wherein the controlled application of mechanical tension to the damaged limb immobilises the broken bones, and so facilitates the biological process of distraction osteogenesis (the regeneration of bone and soft tissue) in a reliable and reproducible manner. Moreover, external fixation with the apparatus allows the damaged limb to bear weight early in the medical treatment.

Once emplaced onto the limb, the top rings of the apparatus transfer mechanical force to the bottom ring through the rods, and so by-pass the site of the fractured bone, thus the Ilizarov apparatus immobilizes the damaged limb and relieves mechanical stresses from the wound, which then allows the patient to move the entire limb. The middle rings stiffen the support rods and hold the bone fragments in place, whilst supporting the immobilised limb. In by-passing the site of the bone fracture, the top and bottom rings bear the critical load by transferring mechanical force from the area of healthy bone above the fracture to the area of healthy bone below the fracture.

== Clinical application ==
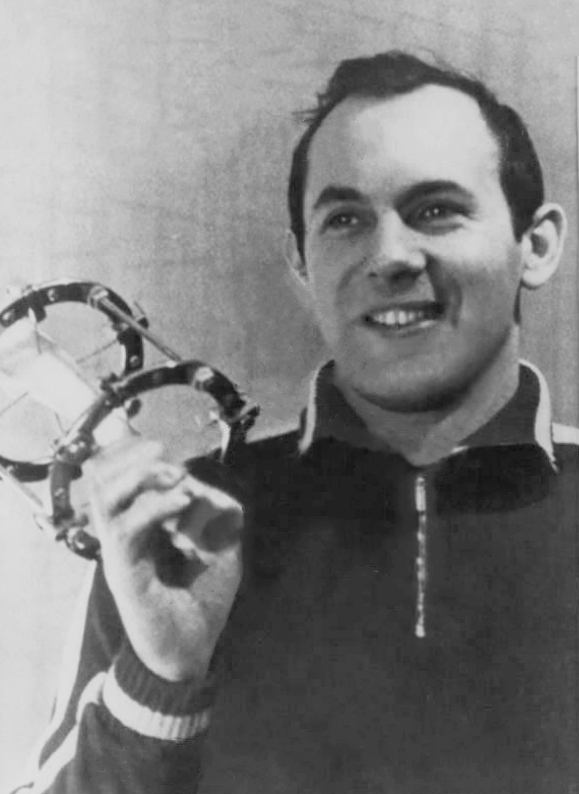
Ilizarov apparatus: The Soviet athlete Valeriy Brumel holds a model of the external fixation apparatus that repaired the broken tibia bone and the broken ankle bones of his right leg. (1968)

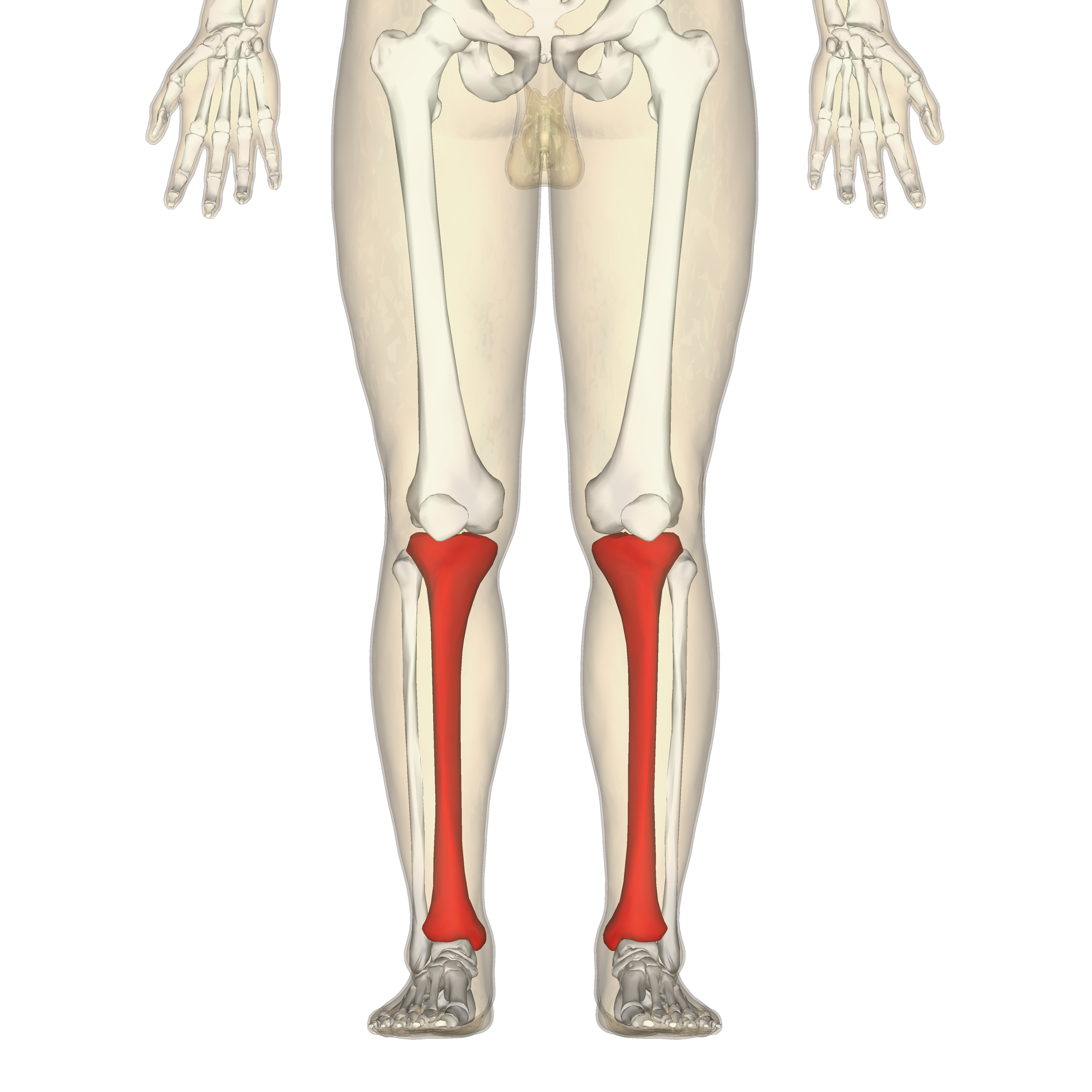
Location and position of the tibia bones (red) in the legs.

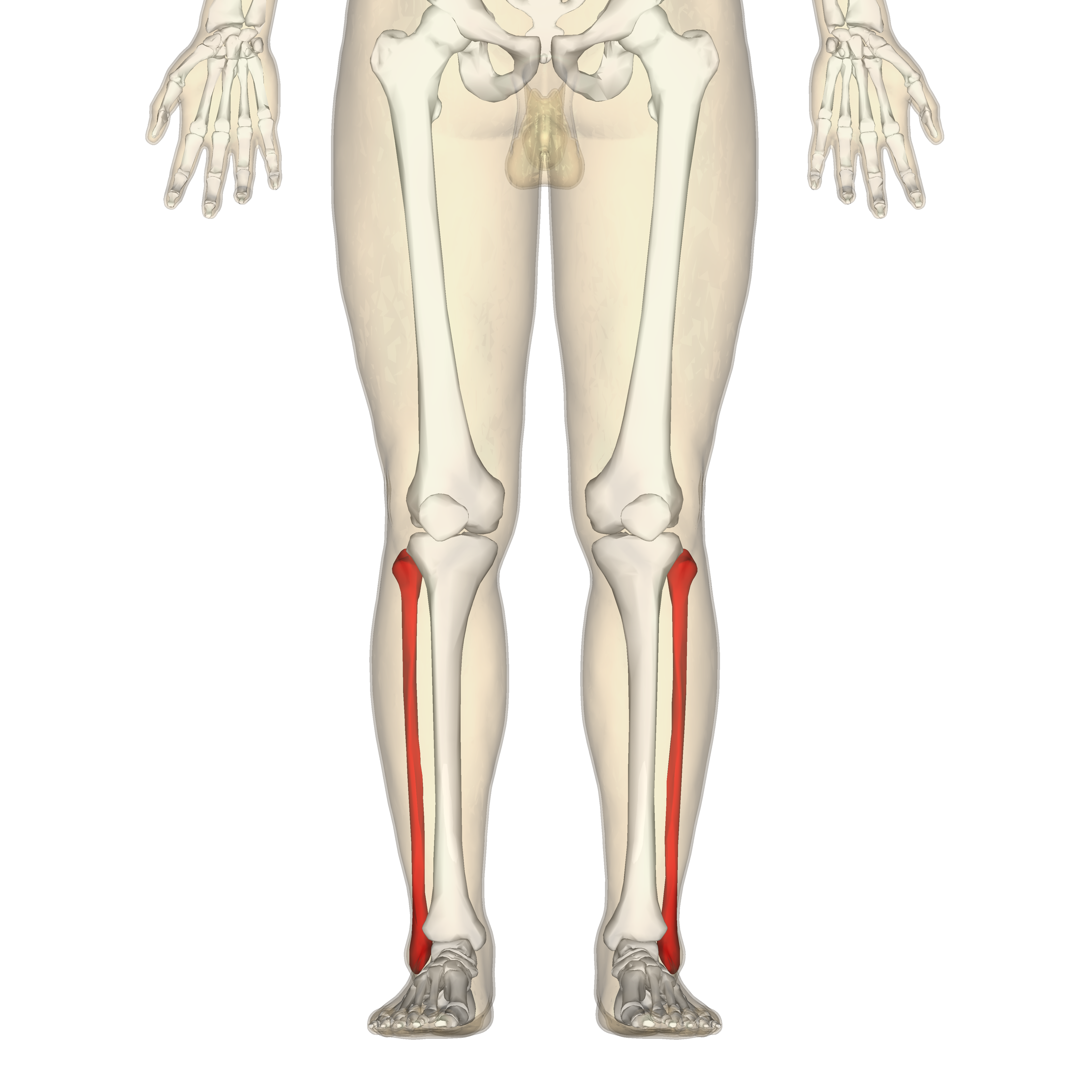
Location and position of the fibula bones (red) in the legs

The Ilizarov surgical method of distraction osteogenesis (regeneration of bone and soft tissues) for repairing complex fractures of the bones of the limbs is the preferred treatment for cases featuring a high risk of bacterial infection; and for cases wherein the extent and severity of the fracture precludes using internal fixators to immobilise the damaged bone for proper repair.

In 1968, Ilizarov successfully treated the non-union osteopathy of Valeriy Brumel, a Soviet Olympic gold medalist in the high jump who had broken his right ankle, tibia, and fibula in a 1965 motorcycle accident. After more than twenty failed surgeries, not only had his bones not healed but the injured leg remained shorter than before the breaks. Employing distraction osteogenesis enabled by an external-fixation apparatus, Brumel's osteopathic non-union grew new leg bone, extending it 3.5 cm (1.4 in) to its normal length.

In 1980, Ilizarov successfully treated the osteopathic non-union of Carlo Mauri, a journalist and an explorer, who, ten years earlier, had broken the distal end of a tibia in an Alpine accident, yet his broken leg-bone had yet to heal. During an expedition in the Atlantic Ocean, Mauri's leg wound reopened; a concerned teammate, a Russian doctor, recommended that Mauri consult with Ilizarov for proper diagnosis, surgical repair, and treatment in the city of Kurgan, Russia.

In 2013, consequent to a PTSD-induced fall that broke his left leg, the British war correspondent Ed Vulliamy underwent limb-sparing medical treatment that featured surgeries and an Ilizarov apparatus to repair and heal the severely fractured bones in his left leg.

Clinical example

The photographs and radiographs illustrate the application and emplacement of an external fixator, an Ilizarov apparatus, to repair the open fracture of the lower left leg of a man. The photographs were taken four weeks after the patient fractured the shinbone (tibia) and the calfbone (fibula) of his left leg, and two weeks after the surgical emplacement of the Ilizarov apparatus to immobilise the leg and isolate the wound and fracture site to facilitate healing.

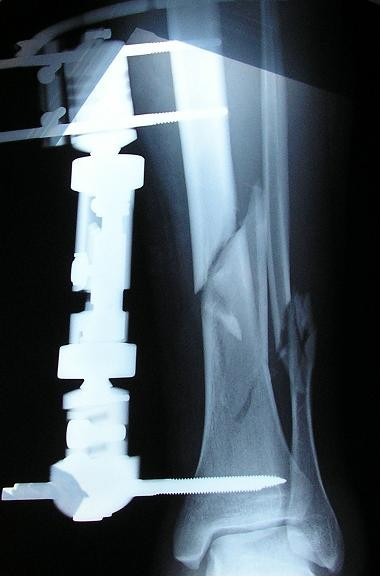
X-ray of the open fracture of the left leg; the external fixator was installed ca. 24 hrs. in hospital.

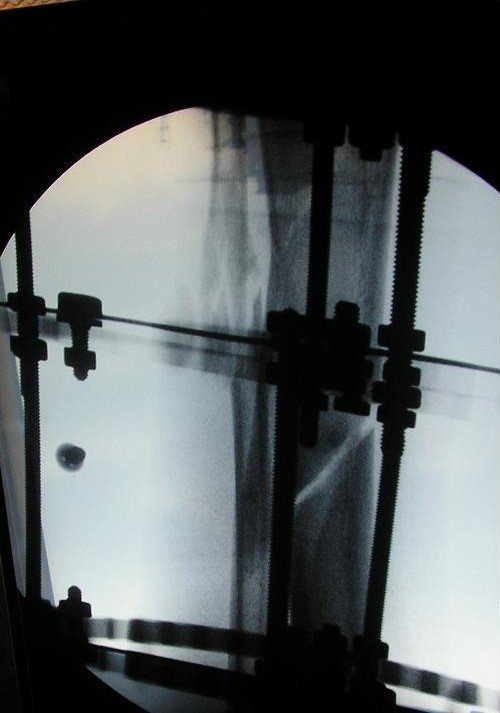
X-ray of the open fracture site immediately after installation of the Ilizarov apparatus.

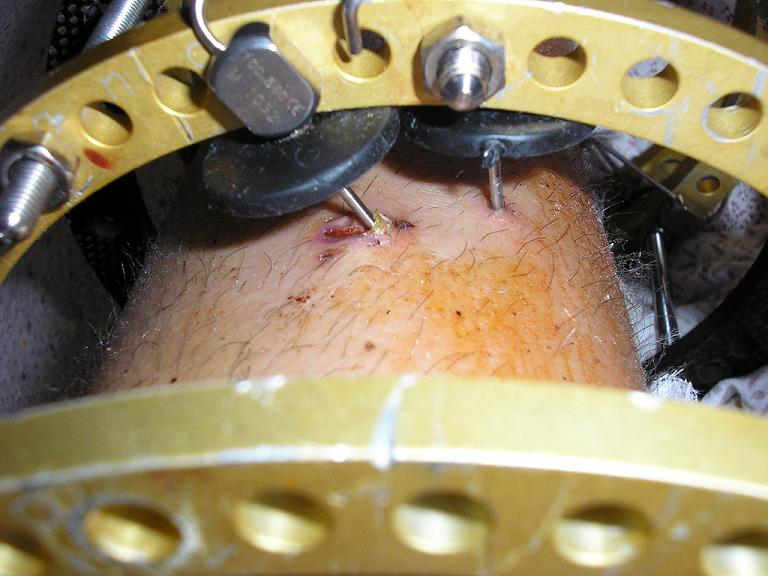
Superior perspective of the Ilizarov apparatus and the Kirschner pins in the left leg at two weeks post-surgical.

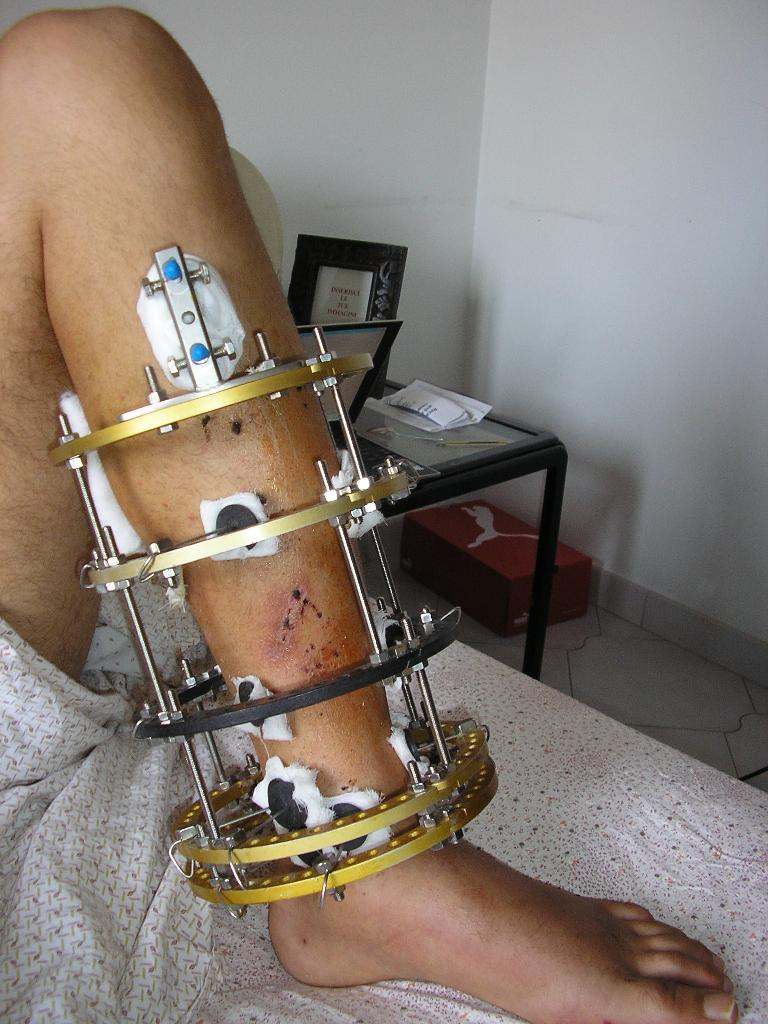
The Ilizarov apparatus immobilising the fractured tibia and fibula bones; the open-fracture site is above the black ring.

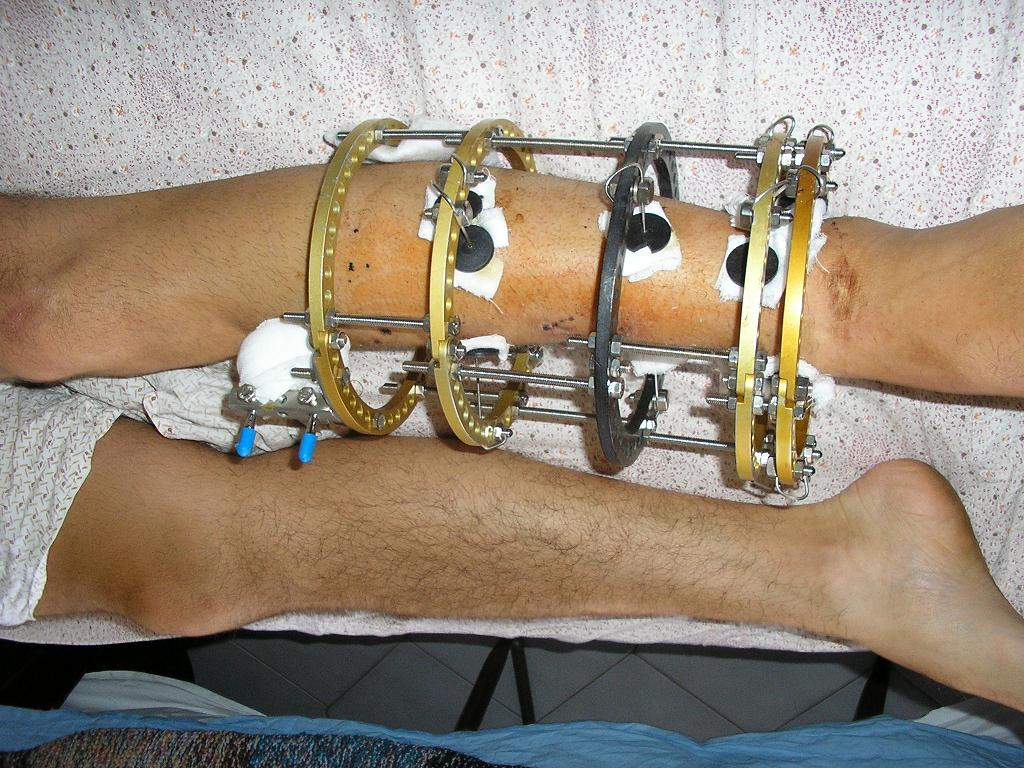
Superior perspective of the apparatus emplaced into the left leg of the patient.

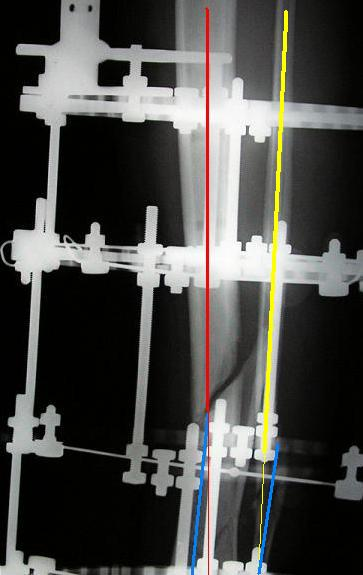
X-ray of the fracture site and the emplaced apparatus, two months post-fracture; perspective 1-4.

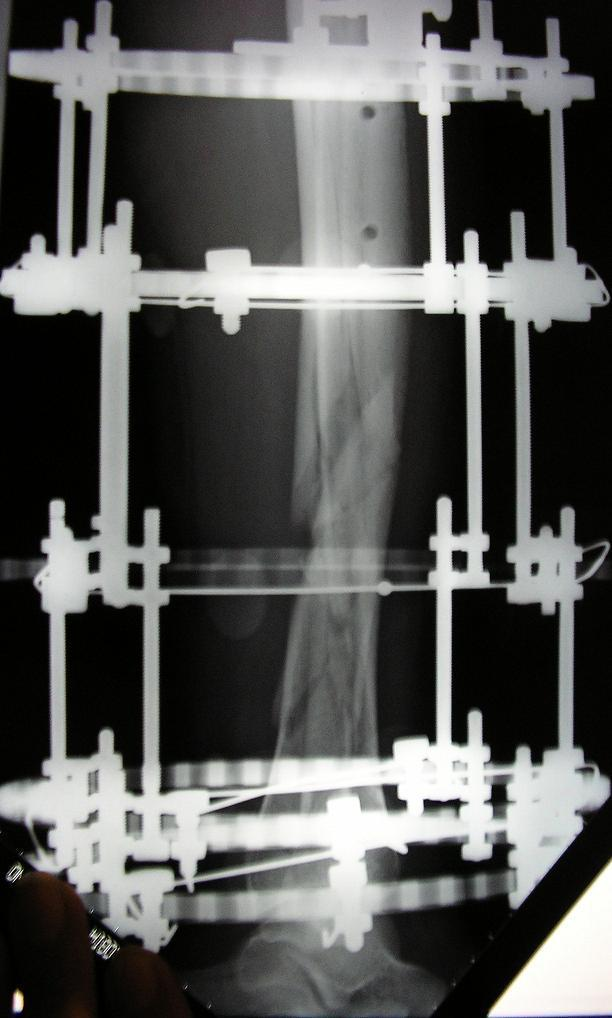
X-ray of the fracture site and the emplaced apparatus, two months post-fracture; perspective 2-4.

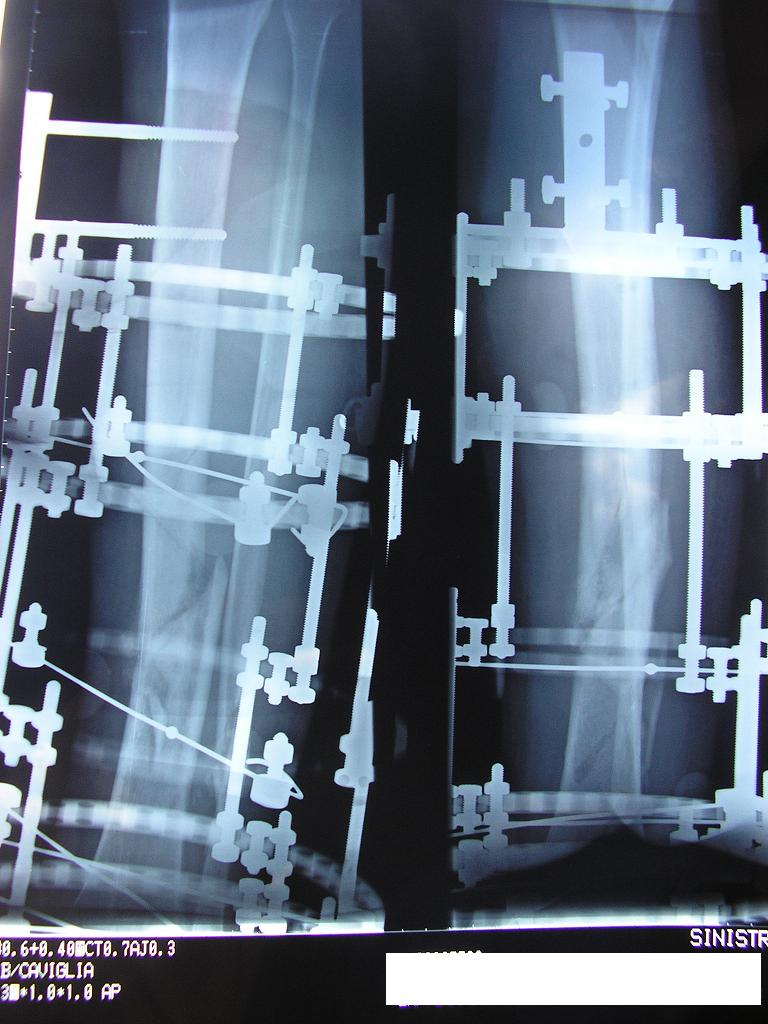
X-ray of the callus forming at the fracture site, three months post-fracture; perspective 3-4.

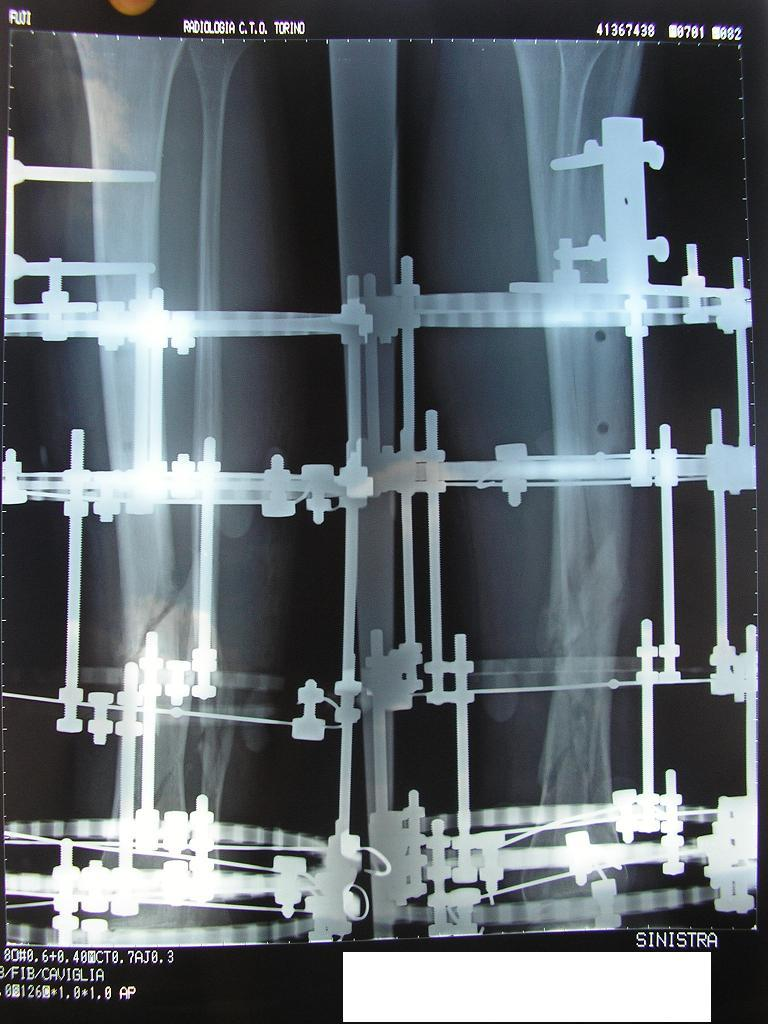
X-ray of the callus forming around the fracture site, three months post-fracture; perspective 4-4.

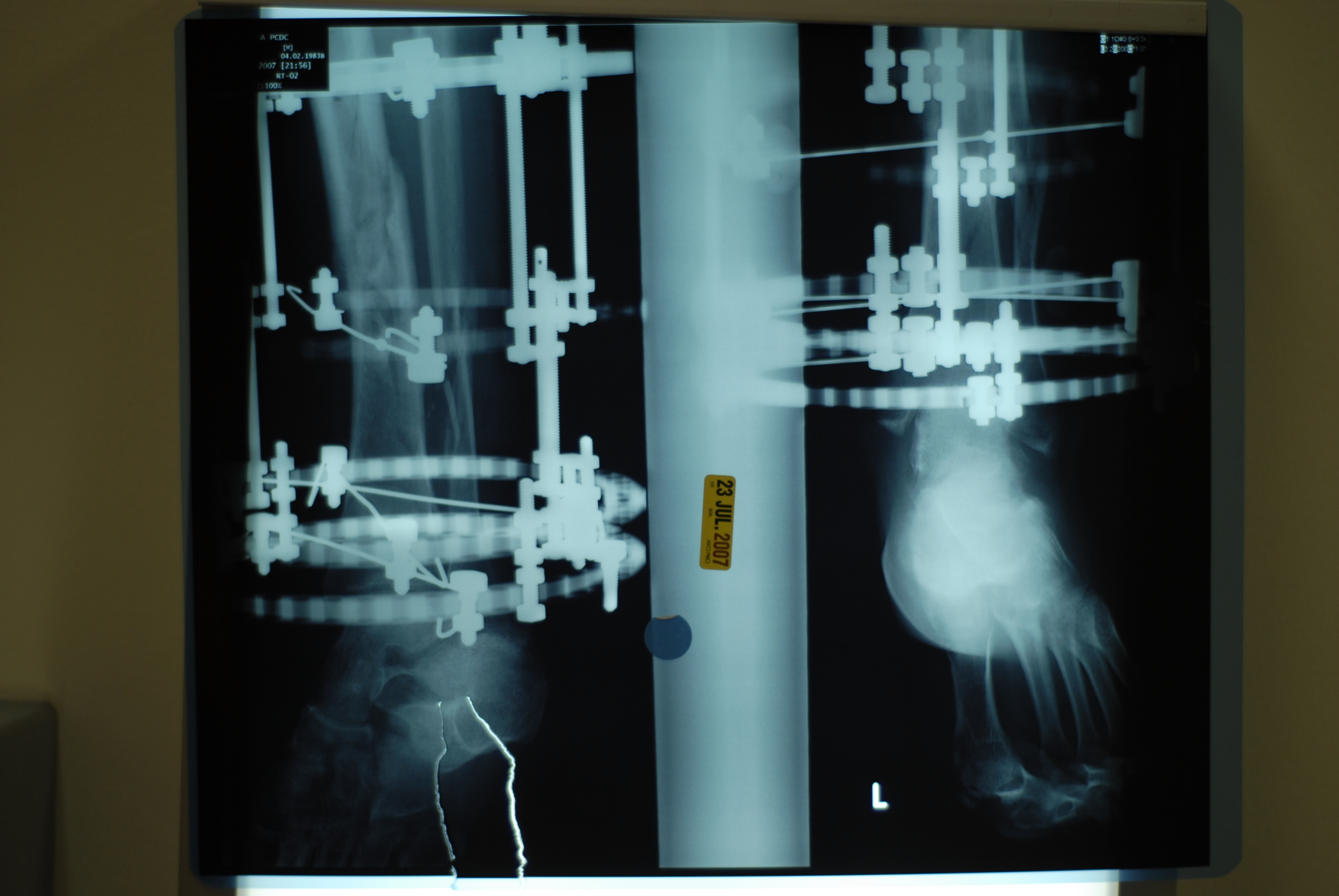
X-ray perspectives of the callus-formation progress and healing of the fractured tibia and fibula bones, four months post-fracture.

== Bone deformation repair ==
The Ilizarov apparatus corrects deformed bones by way of the process of distraction osteogenesis, which reproduces bone tissues. After an initial surgery during which the bone to repair is fractured, and the apparatus is attached to the limb of the patient; once the fracture has been immobilised, the bone tissues begin to grow and eventually bridge the fracture with new bone. In the course of the osteogenesis process, the bone grows and the physician extends the rods of the Ilizarov apparatus to increase the space between the rings at each end of the apparatus. As the rings are installed at and connected to the opposite ends of the fracture site, the adjustment, done four times a day, separates the healing fracture by approximately one millimetre per day; in due course, the millimetric adjustments lengthen the bone of the damaged limb. Upon completing the bone-lengthening phase of treatment, the Ilizarov apparatus remains emplace for a period of osteopathic consolidation, the ossification of the regenerated bone tissues. Using crutches, the patient is able to bear weight on the damaged limb; once healed, the patient undergoes a second surgery to remove the Ilizarov apparatus from the repaired limb. The result of the Ilizarov surgical treatment is a limb that is much longer than before the medical treatment.

In the case of lengthening a leg bone, an additional surgery will lengthen the Achilles tendon to accommodate the longer length of the treated bone. The therapeutic advantage of the Ilizarov treatment is that the patient can be physically active whilst awaiting the bone to repair. The Ilizarov apparatus also is used to treat and resolve a structural defect in a long bone, by transporting a segment of bone whilst simultaneously lengthening and regenerating the bone to reduce the defect, and so produce a single bone. Installing the Ilizarov apparatus requires minimally invasive surgery, and is not free of medical complications, such as inflammation, muscle transfixion, and contracture of the affected joint.

== See also ==
- Bone healing
- Fibrocartilage callus
- Osteoporosis
- Stress fracture
- Blowout fracture
- Pseudarthrosis
- List of Russian inventions
- Instruments used in general surgery
- Timeline of Russian innovation
- Fibular hemimelia
