= Ligamentotaxis =

- Specialty: Orthopedic

In orthopedic surgery, ligamentotaxis is a technique of using continuous longitudinal force (distraction) in order to bring fracture fragments more closely together. It is used as a temporary measure in the management of a broken bone.

Ligamentotaxis is the basis for the use of the external fixator in unstable distal long bone fractures. By applying longitudinal distraction force, the soft tissues surrounding the fracture help mould the bony fragments and facilitate reduction.
