= Taylor Spatial Frame =

Orthopedic surgical apparatus

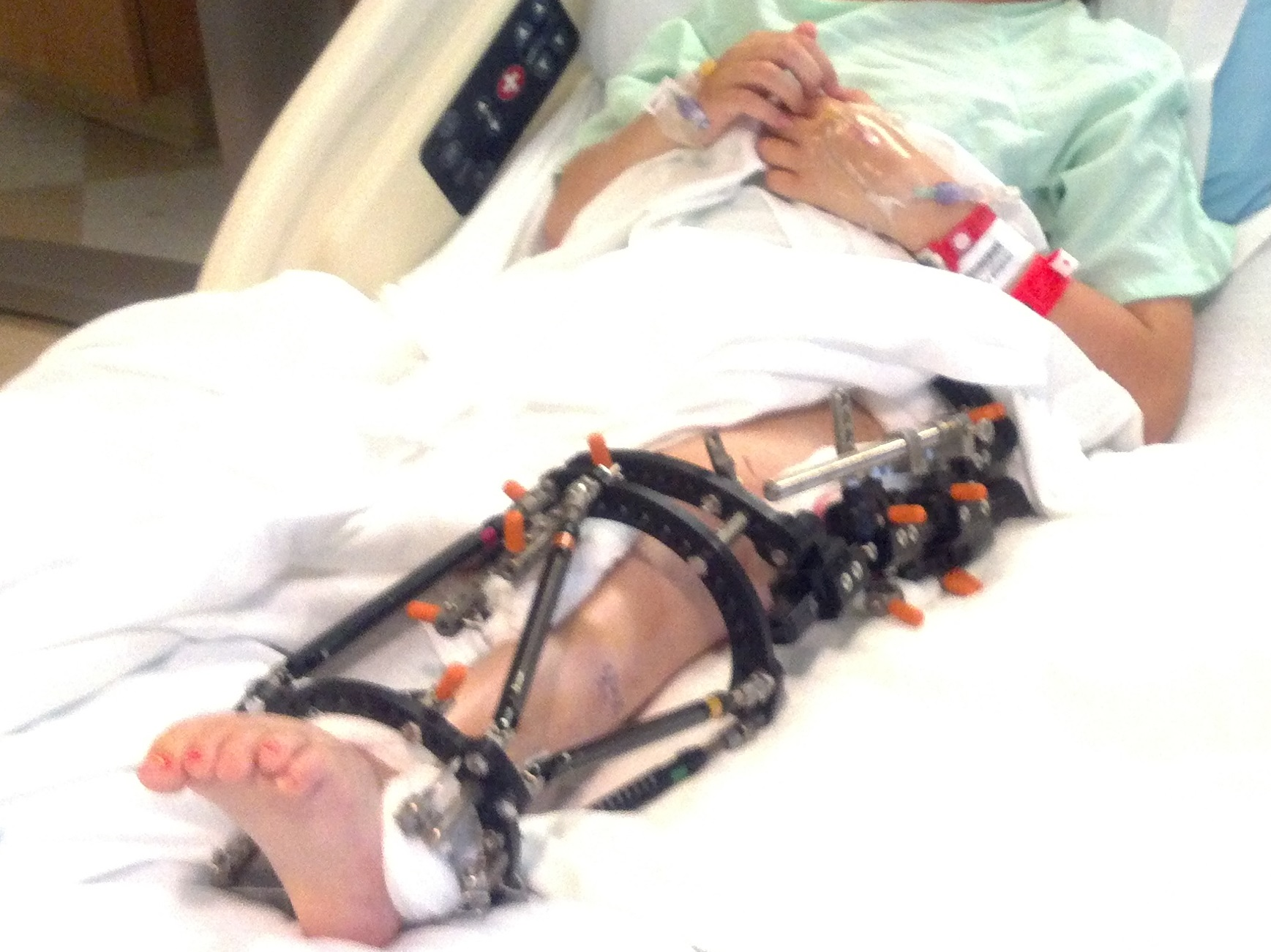
A Taylor Spatial Frame on the left leg consisting of metal rings, pins and struts

The Taylor Spatial Frame (TSF) is an external fixator used by podiatric and orthopaedic surgeons to treat complex fractures and bone deformities. The medical device shares a number of components and features of the Ilizarov apparatus. The Taylor Spatial Frame is a hexapod device based on a Stewart platform, and was invented by orthopaedic surgeon Charles Taylor. The device consists of two or more aluminum or carbon fibre rings connected by six struts. Each strut can be independently lengthened or shortened to achieve the desired result, e.g. compression at the fracture site, lengthening, etc. Connected to a bone by tensioned wires or half pins, the attached bone can be manipulated in three dimensions and 9 degrees of freedom. Angular, translational, rotational, and length deformities can all be corrected simultaneously with the TSF.

The TSF is used in both adults and children. It is used for the treatment of acute fractures, mal-unions, non-unions and congenital deformities. It can be used on both the upper and lower limbs. Specialised foot rings (which are not seen in the picture) are also available for the treatment of complex foot deformities.

== Post Operative procedure ==
=== Correcting deformities ===
Once the fixator is attached to the bone, the deformity is characterised by studying the postoperative x-rays, or CT scans. The angular, translational, rotational, and length deformity values are then entered into specialised software, along with mounting parameters and hardware parameters such as the ring size and initial strut lengths. The software then produces a "prescription" of strut changes that the patient follows. The struts are adjusted daily by the patient until the correct alignment is achieved.

Correction of the bone deformity can typically take 3–4 weeks. For simpler fractures where no deformity is present the struts may still be adjusted post-surgery to achieve better bone alignment, but the correction takes less time. For individuals performing strut adjustment. a hand mirror may be useful to aid in reading the strut settings.

Once the deformity has been corrected, the frame is then left on the limb until the bone fully heals. This often takes 3–6 months, depending on the nature and degree of deformity.

=== Dynamisation ===
When the bone has sufficiently healed, the frame can be dynamised. This is a process of gradually reducing the supportive role of the frame by reducing the length stability. This causes force that was previously transmitted around the fracture site and through the struts to be transmitted through the bone.

=== Removal of frame ===
After a period of dynamisation, the frame can be removed. This is a relatively simple procedure often performed under gas and air analgesic.

The rings are removed by cutting the olive wires using wire cutters.

The wires are then removed by first sterilising them and then pulling them through the leg using pliers. The threaded half pins are simply unscrewed.

== Use for fractures ==
External fixation via TSFs tends to be less invasive than internal fixation and therefore has lower risks of infection associated with it. This is particularly relevant for open fractures.

For open comminuted fractures of the tibial plateau the use of circular frames (like TSF) has markedly reduced infection rates.

The time taken for bones to heal (time to union) varies depending on a number of factors. Open fractures take longer to heal, and infection will delay union. For tibial fractures union is generally achieved after between 3 and 6 months, though time to union can be rather subjective, and the dynamistion process combined with irregular appointments may interfere with these measures.

== Infection ==
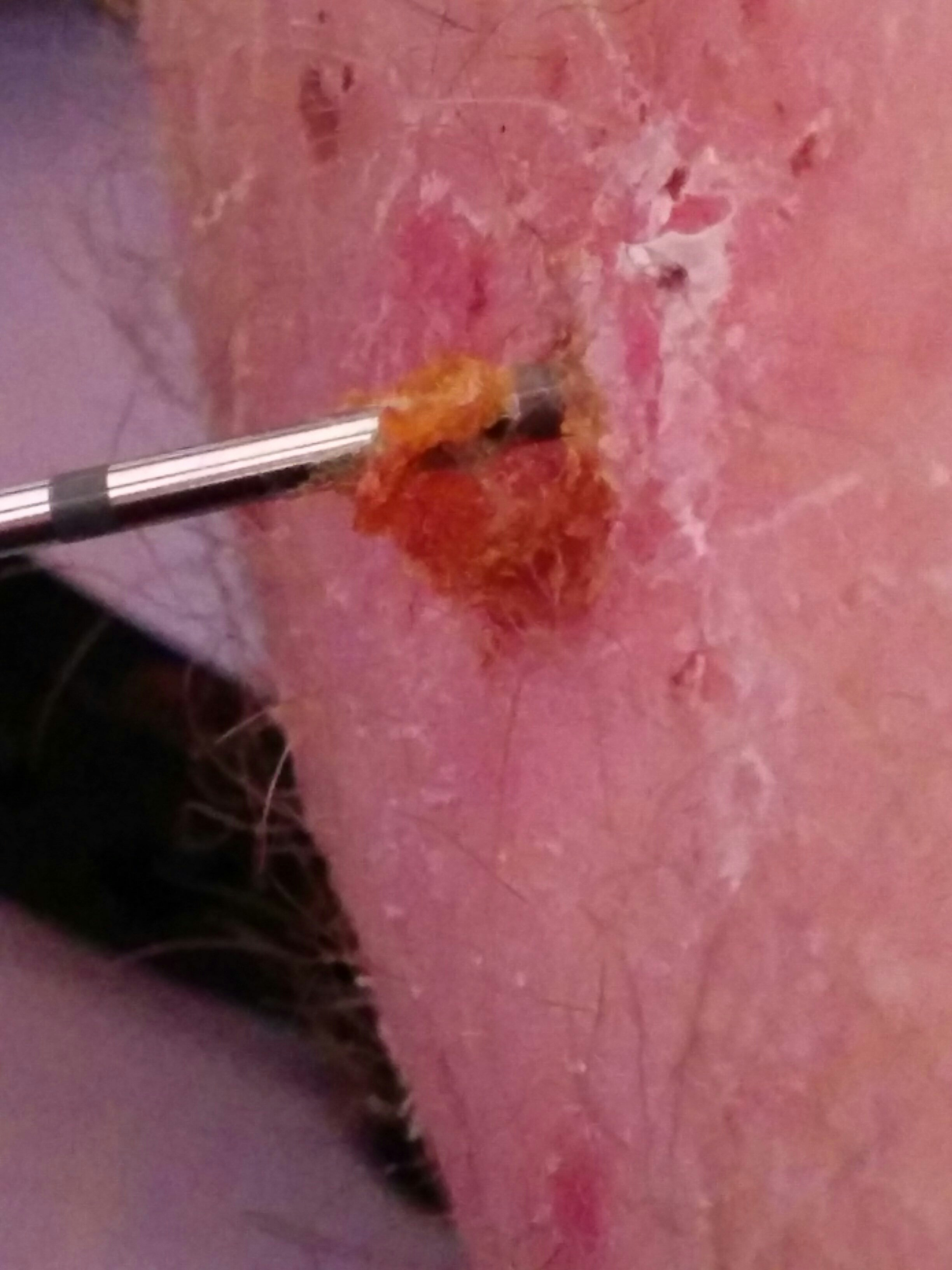
Site with a lot of dried exudate that might merit dressing

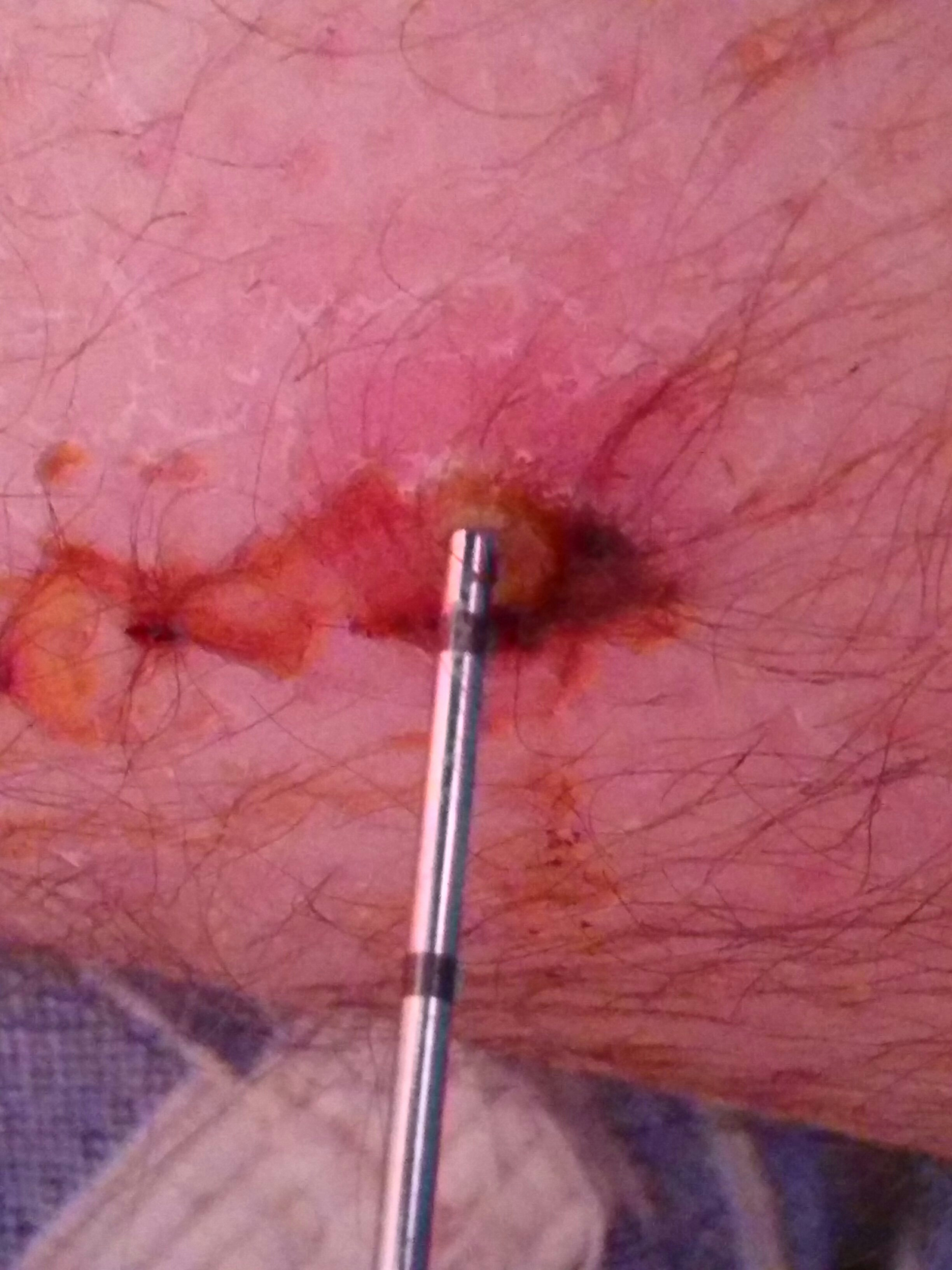
Site with "weeping" exudate that might merit dressing

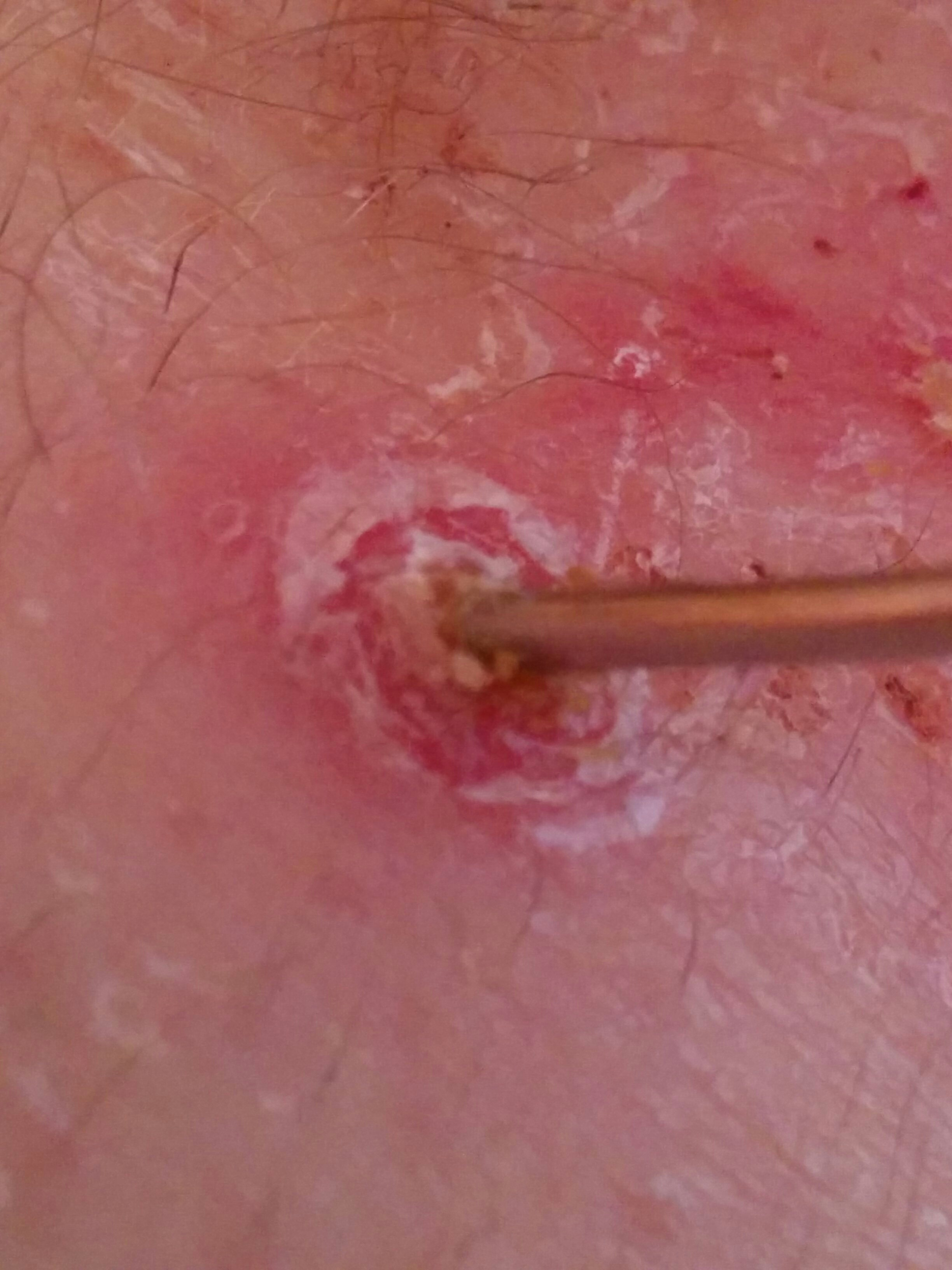
Site with crust and no exudate: some advice suggests maintaining crust

Pin sites in various states

Infection of the pin sites (points where wires enter the skin) of the TSF is a common complication (estimates are that it affects 20% percent of patients). In extreme cases this can result in osteomylitis which is difficult to treat. However, pin site infections are normally successfully treated with a combination of oral antibiotics, intravenous antibiotics, or removal of the affected pin.

Pin sites are classified as percutaneous wounds

Best practice for maintenance of pin sites is unclear and requires more study. Common practice involves the regular cleaning of the pin sites with chlorhexidine gluconate solution (advice varies from every day to every week), regular showering, and dressing of sites that exude liquid with non-woven gauze soaked in chlorhexidine gluconate. This dressing can be held in place with bungs or makeshift clips or by twisting around the wire.

Advice varies as to whether scab tissue or any "crust" surrounding a pin site should be maintained. With some literature arguing that this acts as a barrier to entry, while other literature argues this may increase the risk of infection.

== See also ==
- Distraction osteogenesis
- Bone fracture
- Trauma surgery
- Traumatology
- External fixation
- Octopod External Fixator
