= Classification of distal radius fractures =

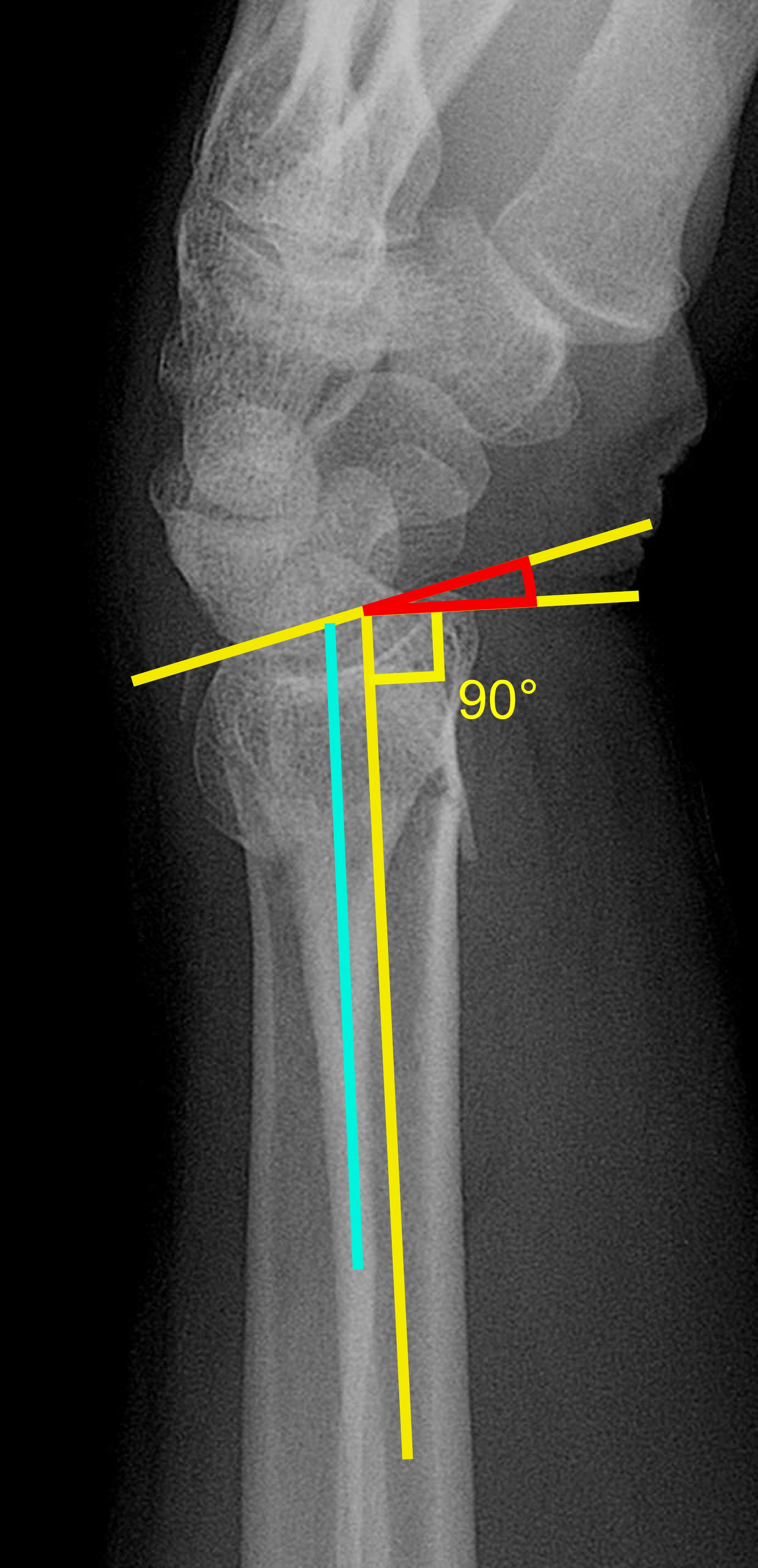
Fracture with a dorsal tilt. Dorsal is left, and volar is right in the image.

Classifications systems of distal radius fractures aim to aggregate patterns of injury which behave in predictable ways, to distinguish between conditions which have different outcomes or which need different treatments. At one extreme, a stable undisplaced extra-articular fracture can be managed conservatively with a cast immobilization. On the other hand, a displaced intra-articular two-part shear fracture is often unstable and requires open reduction and internal fixation. Current systems rely on features such as involvement of adjacent joints (Frykman), anatomical displacement and method of injury (Melone), and severity (AO/OTA). Individually, these classification systems have limited acceptance and there is currently no consensus.

== Anatomy ==
An anatomic description of the fracture is the easiest way to describe the fracture, determine treatment, and assess stability.

- Articular incongruity
- Volar or dorsal tilt
- Radial inclination
- Radial length and ulnar variance
- Comminution of the fracture (the amount of crumbling at the fracture site)
- Open (compound fracture) vs. closed injury
- Associated ulnar styloid fracture
- Associated soft tissue injuries

=== Articular incongruity ===
The articular joint's surface must be smooth for it to function properly. Irregularity may result in radiocarpal arthritis, pain, and stiffness. More than 1 mm of incongruity places the patient at a high risk for post-traumatic arthritis. Significant articular incongruity typically occurs in young patients after high energy injuries. If the surface is very irregular and cannot be reconstructed, then the only option may be a fusion of the joint.

=== Volar vs dorsal tilt ===
A dorsal tilt of a distal radius fracture is shown in red in image at right. The angulation goes between:

1. A line drawn between the distal ends of the articular surface of the radius on a lateral X-ray.
2. A line that is perpendicular to the diaphysis of the radius.

Sometimes, the diaphysis of the radius is hard to distinguish from the ulna, and a line between them (turquoise line in image) may be used instead.

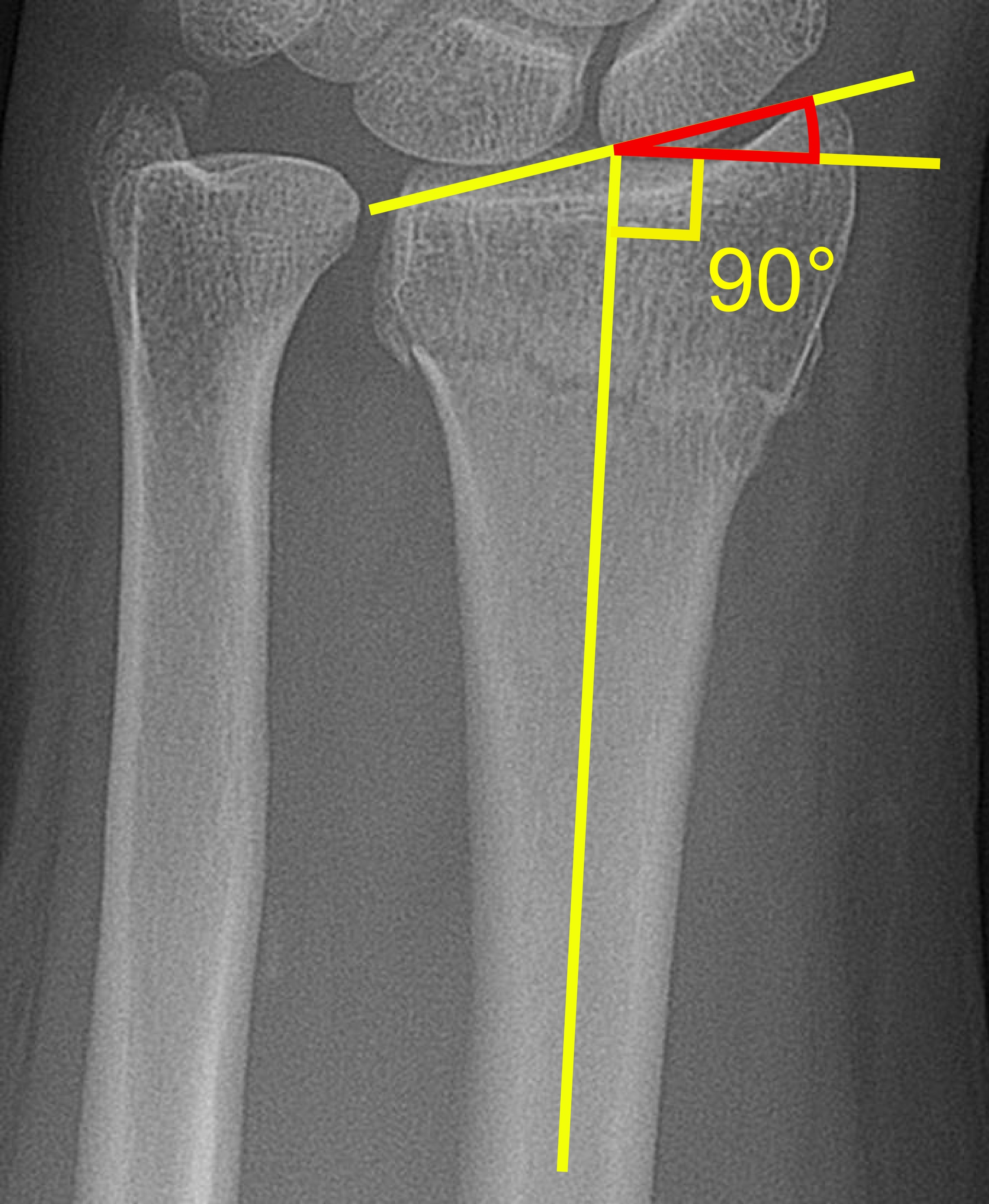
Fracture with a decreased radial inclination (about 15°).

The angle normally has volar tilt of 11° to 12°. The most common fracture pattern usually demonstrates malalignment of this angle and collapse in a dorsal direction. A dorsal tilt of 0° (11° - 12° deviation from normal anatomic position) causes a substantial risk of developing pain and impaired function. After closed reduction, a residual dorsal tilt of a maximum of 5° (16° - 17° deviation) is regarded as the maximal residual angle for a satisfactory result.

==== Radial inclination ====
The radial inclination of a distal radius fracture is shown in red in image at right. The angle is measured between:

1. A line drawn between the distal ends of the articular surface of the radius on an AP view of the wrist.
2. A line that is perpendicular to the diaphysis of the radius.

Radial inclination is normally 21-25°.

=== Radial length and ulnar variance ===
Radial length is an important consideration in distal radius fractures. Radial length should be between 9-12mm. Distal radius fractures typically result in loss of length as the radius collapses from the loading force of the injury. With increasing relative lengthening of the uninjured ulna (positive ulnar variance), ulnar impaction syndrome may occur. Ulnar impaction syndrome is a painful condition of excessive contact and wear between the ulna and the carpus with an associated is a degenerative tear of the TFCC.

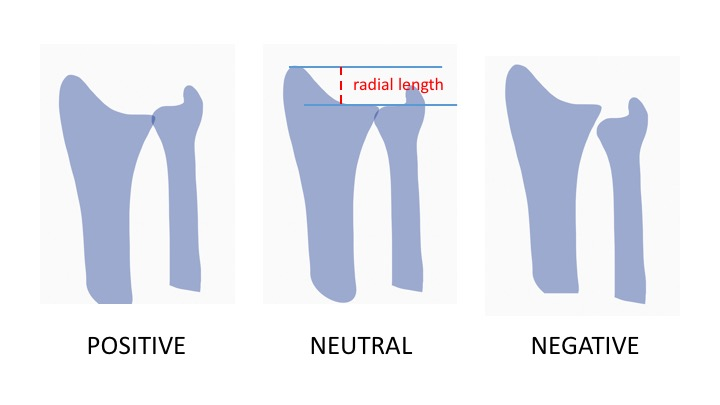
Positive, neutral, and negative ulnar variance. Relationship between radial length and ulnar variance. Radial length is the measure from distal ulna to radial styloid process. When ulnar variance is neutral radial length should be between 9-12mm.

== Melone classification ==
The system that comes closest to directing treatment has been devised by Melone. This system breaks distal radius fractures down into 4 components: radial styloid, dorsal medial fragment, volar medial fragment, and radial shaft. The two medial fragments (which together create the lunate fossa) are grouped together as the medial complex.

Type	Description	Note
I	No displacement of medial complex: No comminution.	Fracture is stable after closed reduction
II	Unstable depression fracture of lunate fossa ("die-punch"): Moderate/severe medial complex displacement.; Comminution of dorsal and volar cortices.	IIA - Irreducible, closed fracture.; IIB - Irreducible, closed due to impaction
III	Type II fracture plus a 'spike' of the radius volarly	May impinge on median nerve
IV	Split fracture: Severe comminution; Rotation of fragments.	Unstable
V	Explosion injuries: Severe displacement/comminution	Often associated with diaphyseal comminution

== Frykman classification ==
Though the Frykman classification system has traditionally been used, there is little value in its use because it does not help direct treatment. This system focuses on articular and ulnar involvement. The classification is as follows:

Radius Fracture	Ulna Fracture	
Radius Fracture	Absent	Present
Extra-articular	I	II
Intra-articular involving radiocarpal joint	III	IV
Intra-articular involving DRUJ (distal radio-ulnar joint)	V	VI
Intra-articular involving both radiocarpal & DRUJ	VII	VIII

== Universal classification ==
The Universal classification system is descriptive but also does not direct treatment. Universal codes are:

Type	Location	Displacement	Sub-type
I	Extra-articular	Undisplaced	
II	Extra-articular	Displaced	A: Reducible, stable B: Reducible, unstable C: Irreducible
III	Intra-articular	Undisplaced	
IV	Intra-articular	Displaced	A: Reducible, stable B: Reducible, unstable C: Irreducible D: Complex

== AO/OTA classification ==
Widely used system that includes 27 subgroups. Three main groups based on fracture joint involvement (A - extra-articular, B - partial articular, C - complete articular). Classification further defined based on level of comminution and direction of displacement. A qualification (Q) modifier can be added to classify associated ulnar injury.

== Fernandez classification ==
Simplified system developed in response to AO classification, intended to be based on injury mechanism with more treatment-oriented classifications (treatment suggestions not meant to be used as rigid guidelines but can be used to help decision making on a case-by-case basis)

Type	Description	Stability	Number of Fragments	Associated Lesions (see below)	Recommended Treatment
I	Bending fracture - metaphysis	Stable or unstable	2 main fragments with variable metaphyseal comminution	Uncommon	Stable -> conservative Unstable -> percutaneous pinning or external fixation
II	Shearing fracture - articular surface	Unstable	2, 3, comminuted	Less uncommon	Open reduction with screw-plate fixation
III	Compression fracture - articular surface	Stable or unstable	2, 3, 4, comminuted	Common	Closed; Limited arthroscopic release; Extensile open reduction; Percutaneous pins plus external and internal fixation; Bone graft
IV	Avulsion fracture, radiocarpal fracture, dislocation	Unstable	2 (radial/ulnar styloids), 3, comminuted	Frequent (especially ligamentous injury)	Closed or open reduction with pin/screw fixation or tension wiring
V	Combined fracture (high-energy injury) - Often intra-articular and open	Unstable	Comminuted	Always present	Combined treatment

Note: Associated Lesions include carpal ligament injury, nerve injury, tendon damage, and compartment syndrome
