= Colles' fracture =

Type of distal radius fracture

- Other names: Colles fracture, Pouteau fracture
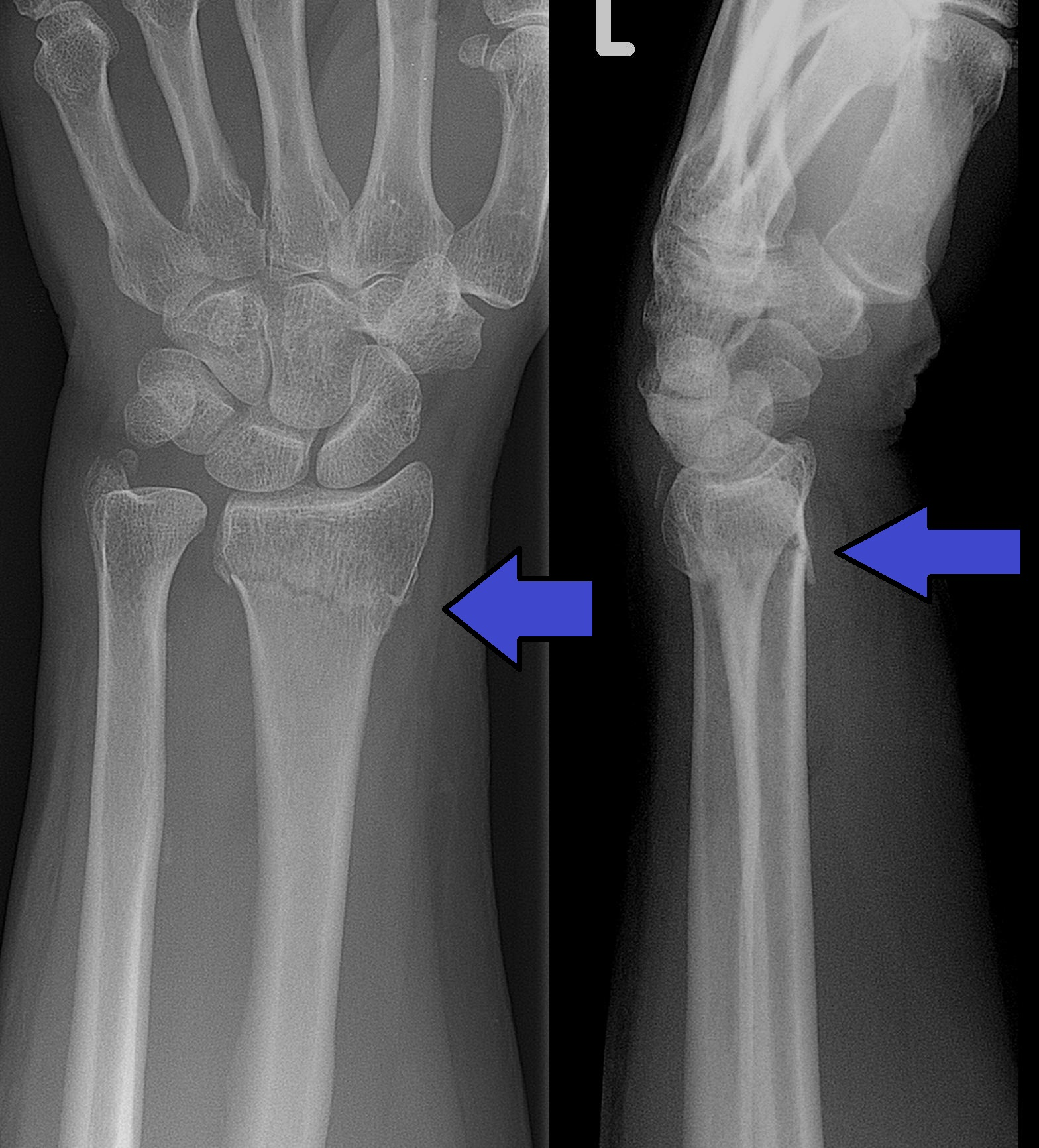
- An X-ray showing a Colles' fracture
- Specialty: Emergency medicine, orthopedics
- Symptoms: Pain, swelling, deformity, bruising
- Usual onset: Sudden
- Causes: Fall on an outstretched hand
- Risk factors: Osteoporosis
- Diagnostic method: X-rays
- Treatment: Cast, surgery
- Prognosis: Recovery over 1 to 2 years
- Frequency: ~15% lifetime risk

A Colles' fracture is a type of fracture of the distal forearm in which the broken end of the radius is bent backwards. Symptoms may include pain, swelling, deformity, and bruising. Complications may include damage to the median nerve.

It typically occurs as a result of a fall on an outstretched hand. Risk factors include osteoporosis. The diagnosis may be confirmed via X-rays. The tip of the ulna may also be broken.

Treatment may include casting or surgery. Surgical reduction and casting is possible in the majority of cases in people over the age of 50. Pain management can be achieved during the reduction with procedural sedation and analgesia or a hematoma block. A year or two may be required for healing to occur.

About 15% of people have a Colles' fracture at some point in their life. They occur more commonly in young adults and older people than in children and middle-aged adults. Women are more frequently affected than men. The fracture is named after Abraham Colles who described it in 1814.

== Causes ==
The fracture is most commonly caused by people falling onto a hard surface and breaking their fall with outstretched hand (FOOSH)–falling with wrists flexed would lead to a Smith's fracture. Originally it was described in elderly and/or post-menopausal women. It usually occurs about three to five centimetres proximal to the radio-carpal joint with posterior and lateral displacement of the distal fragment resulting in the characteristic "dinner fork" or "bayonet" like deformity. Colles fracture is a common fracture in people with osteoporosis, second only to vertebral fractures.

== Diagnosis ==
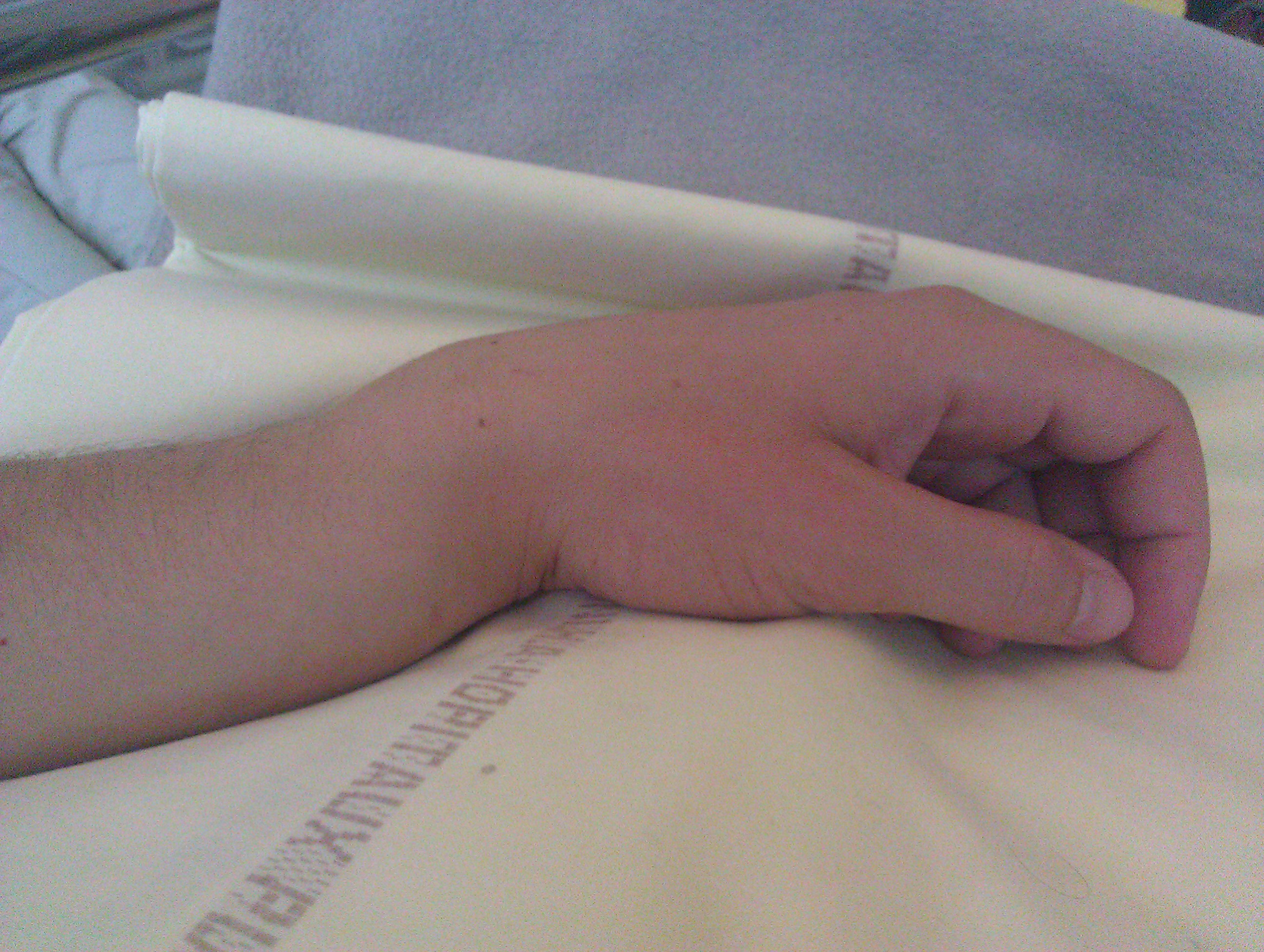
Colles fracture of the left hand, with posterior displacement clearly visible

Diagnosis can be made upon interpretation of anteroposterior and lateral views alone.

The classic Colles fracture has the following characteristics:

- Transverse fracture of the radius
- 2.5 cm (0.98 inches) proximal to the radio-carpal joint
- Dorsal displacement and dorsal angulation, together with radial tilt

Other characteristics:

- Radial shortening
- Loss of ulnar inclination
- Radial angulation of the wrist
- Comminution at the fracture site
- Associated fracture of the ulnar styloid process in more than 60% of cases.

=== Classification ===
The term Colles fracture is classically used to describe a fracture at the distal end of the radius, at its cortico-cancellous junction. However, the term now tends to be used loosely to describe any fracture of the distal radius, with or without involvement of the ulna, that has dorsal displacement of the fracture fragments. Colles himself described it as a fracture that "takes place at about an inch and a half (38mm) above the carpal extremity of the radius" and "the carpus and the base of metacarpus appears to be thrown backward". The fracture is sometimes referred to as a "dinner fork" or "bayonet" deformity due to the shape of the resultant forearm.

Colles' fractures can be categorized according to several systems including Frykman, Gartland & Werley, Lidström, Nissen-Lie and the Older's classifications.

== Treatment ==
Management depends on the severity of the fracture. An undisplaced fracture may be treated with a cast alone. The cast is applied with the distal fragment in palmar flexion and ulnar deviation. A fracture with mild angulation and displacement may require closed reduction. There is some evidence that immobilization with the wrist in dorsiflexion as opposed to palmarflexion results in less redisplacement and better functional status. Significant angulation and deformity may require an open reduction and internal fixation or external fixation. The volar forearm splint is best for temporary immobilization of forearm, wrist and hand fractures, including Colles fracture.

There are several established instability criteria:

- dorsal tilt >20°
- comminuted fracture
- abruption of the ulnar styloid process
- intraarticular displacement >1mm
- loss of radial height >2mm

A higher amount of instability criteria increases the likelihood of operative treatment.

Treatment modalities differ in the elderly.

Repeat X-rays are recommended at one, two, and six weeks to verify proper healing.

== Prognosis ==
Recovery time depends on the degree of bone displacement, the number of bone fragments, whether or not the break is "intra-articular" (involves the wrist joint), as well as the person's age, gender, and medical history, and may range from two months to a year or more for complete recovery.

== Epidemiology ==
Colles fractures occur in all age groups, although certain patterns follow an age distribution.

- In the elderly, because of the weaker cortex, the fracture is more often extra-articular.
- Younger individuals tend to require a higher energy force to cause the fracture and tend to have more complex intra-articular fractures. In children with open epiphyses, an equivalent fracture is the "epiphyseal slip", as can be seen in other joints, such as a slipped capital femoral epiphysis in the hip. This is a Salter I or II fracture with the deforming forces directed through the weaker epiphyseal plate.
- More common in women because of post-menopausal osteoporosis.

== History ==
The Colles fracture is named after Abraham Colles (1773–1843), an Irish surgeon, from Kilkenny who first described it in 1814 by simply looking at the classic deformity before the advent of X-rays. Ernest Amory Codman was the first to study it using X-rays. His article, published in the Boston Medical and Surgical Journal, now known as The New England Journal of Medicine, also developed the classification system.

It is sometimes said that Claude Pouteau was the first to describe the Colles' fracture (which is sometimes called the Pouteau-Colles fracture), but, according to P. Liverneaux, it is not the case.
