= Distal radius fracture =

Fracture of the radius bone near the wrist

- Other names: Broken wrist
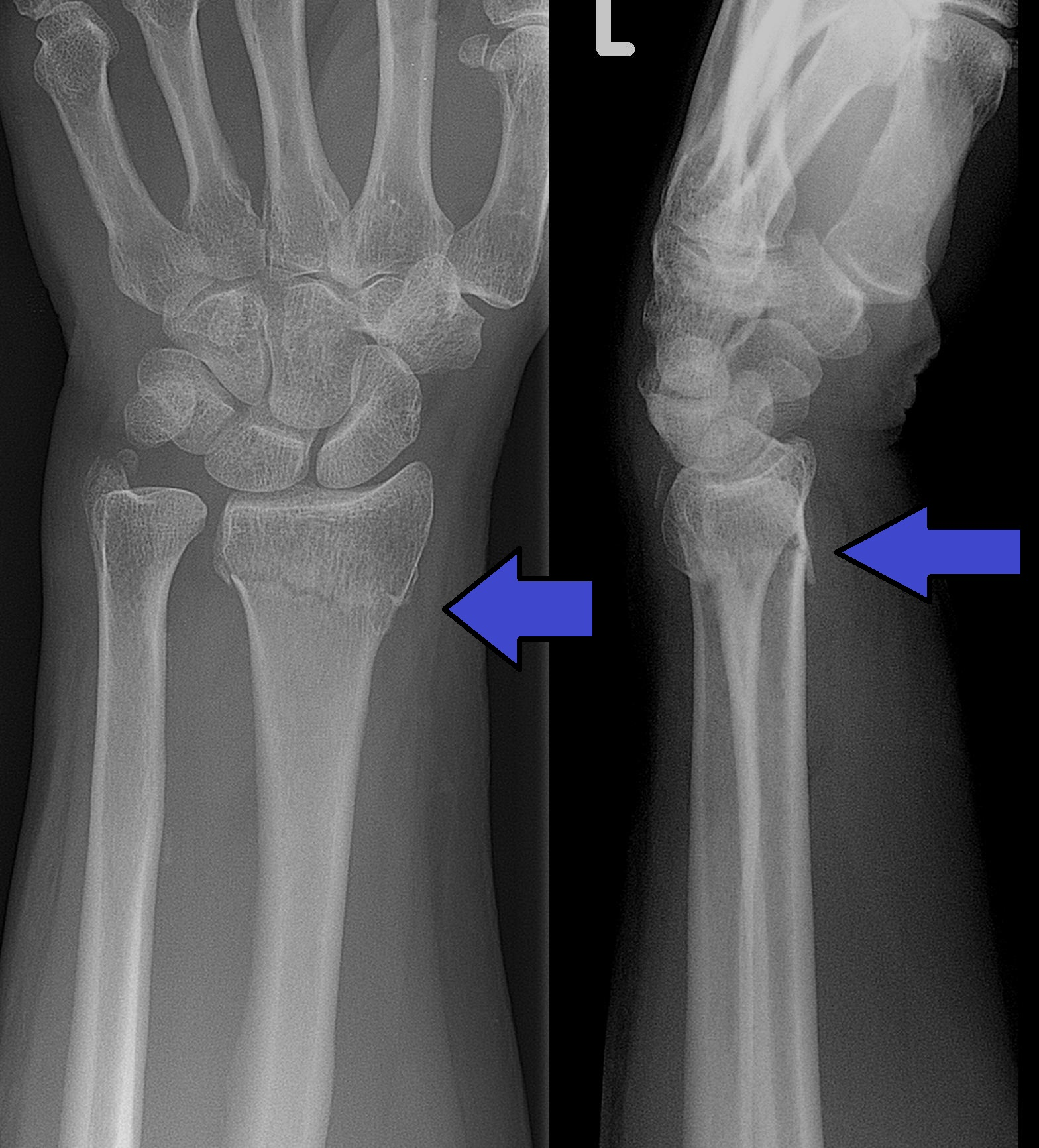
- A Colles fracture as seen on X-ray: It is a type of distal radius fracture.
- Specialty: Orthopedics, emergency medicine
- Symptoms: Pain, bruising, and swelling of the wrist
- Usual onset: Sudden
- Types: Colles' fracture, Smith's fracture, Barton's fracture, Hutchinson fracture
- Causes: Trauma
- Risk factors: Osteoporosis
- Diagnostic method: Based on symptoms, X-rays
- Treatment: Casting, surgery
- Medication: Pain medication, elevation
- Prognosis: Recovery over 1 to 2 years
- Frequency: ≈33% of broken bones

A distal radius fracture, also known as wrist fracture, is a break of the part of the radius bone which is close to the wrist. Symptoms include pain, bruising, and rapid-onset swelling. The ulna bone may also be broken.

In younger people, these fractures typically occur during sports or a motor vehicle collision. In older people, the most common cause is falling on an outstretched hand. Specific types include Colles, Smith, Barton, and Chauffeur's fractures. The diagnosis is generally suspected based on symptoms and confirmed with X-rays.

Treatment is with casting for six weeks or surgery. Surgery is generally indicated if the joint surface is broken and does not line up, the radius is overly short, or the joint surface of the radius is tilted more than 10° backwards. Among those who are cast, repeated X-rays are recommended within three weeks to verify that a good position is maintained.

Distal radius fractures are common, and are the most common type of fractures that are seen in children. Distal radius fractures represent between 25% and 50% of all broken bones and occur most commonly in young males and older females. A year or two may be required for healing to occur. Most children with a buckle wrist fracture experience a broken wrist for life and do have an increased chance of re-fracturing the same spot or other adverse effects.

== Signs and symptoms ==
People usually present with a history of falling on an outstretched hand and complaint of pain and swelling around the wrist, sometimes with deformity around the wrist. Any numbness should be asked to exclude median and ulnar nerve injuries. Any pain in the limb of the same side should also be investigated to exclude associated injuries to the same limb.

Swelling, deformity, tenderness, and loss of wrist motion are normal features on examination of a person with a distal radius fracture. "Dinner fork" deformity of the wrist is caused by dorsal displacement of the carpal bones (Colle's fracture). Reverse deformity is seen in volar angulation (Smith's fracture). The wrist may be radially deviated due to shortening of the radius bone. Examination should also rule out a skin wound which might suggest an open fracture, usually at the side. Tenderness at an area with no obvious deformity may still point to underlying fractures. Decreased sensation especially at the tips of the radial three and one half digits ( thumb, index finger, middle finger and radial portion of the ring finger ) can be due to median nerve injury. Swelling and displacement can cause compression on the median nerve which results in acute carpal tunnel syndrome and requires prompt treatment. Very rarely, pressure on the muscle components of the hand or forearm is sufficient to create a compartment syndrome which can manifest as severe pain and sensory deficits in the hand.

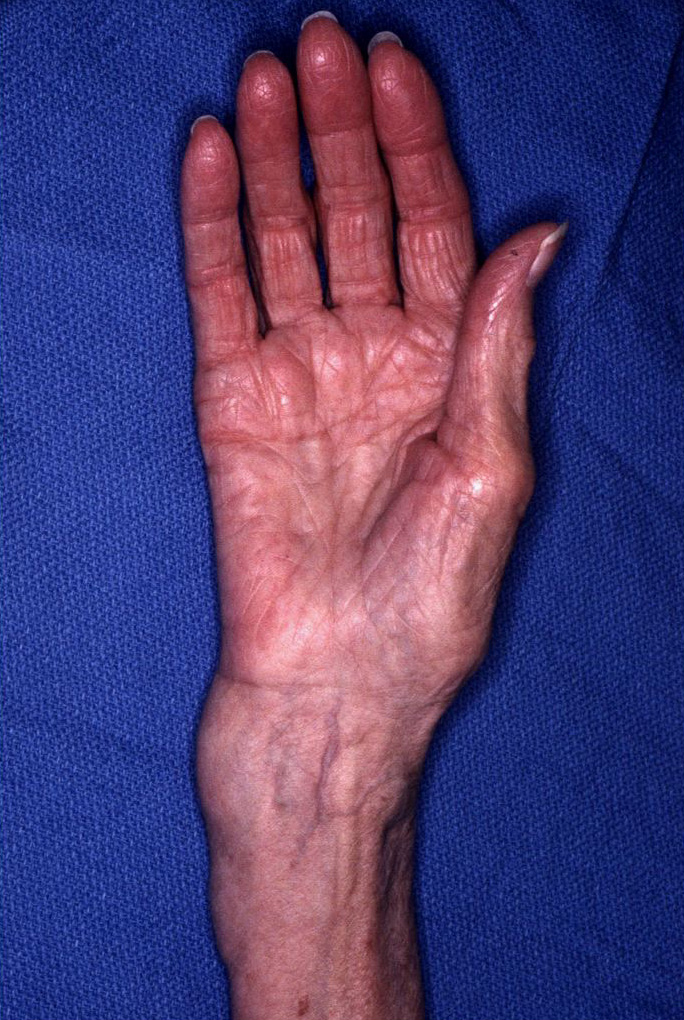
Malreduced distal radius fracture demonstrating the deformity in the wrist

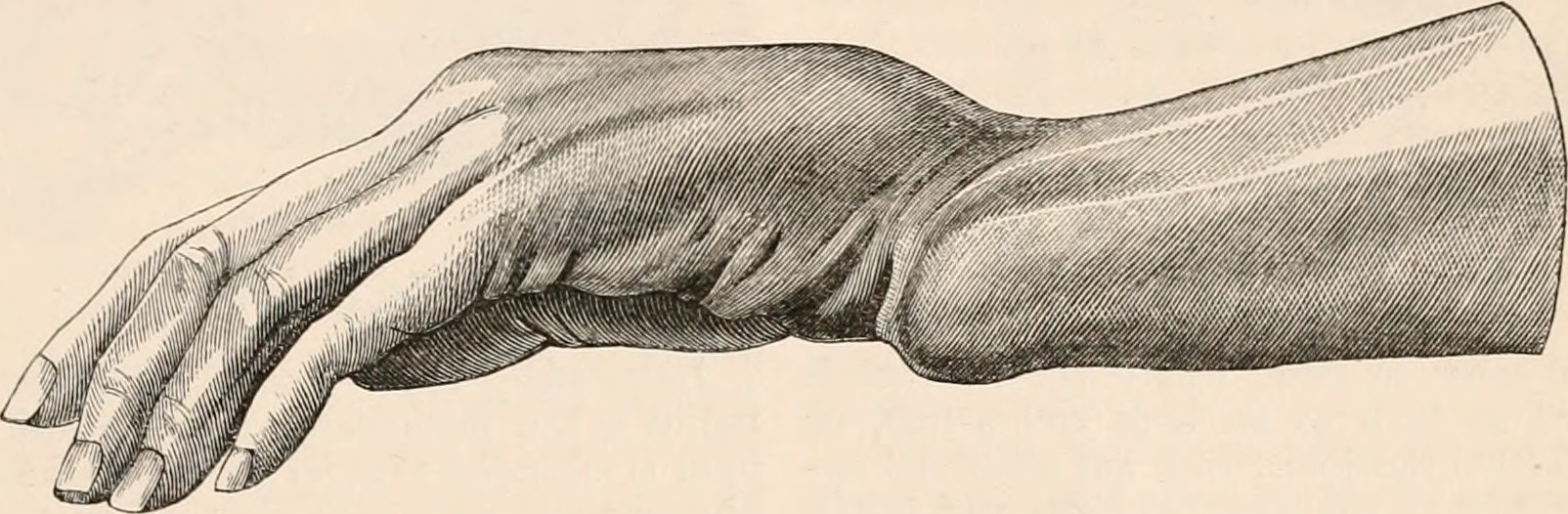
"Dinner fork" deformity

=== Complications ===
Nonunion is rare; almost all of these fractures heal. Malunion, however, is not uncommon, and can lead to residual pain, grip weakness, reduced range of motion (especially rotation), and persistent deformity. Symptomatic malunion may require additional surgery. If the joint surface is damaged and heals with more than 1–2 mm of unevenness, the wrist joint will be prone to post-traumatic osteoarthritis. Half of nonosteoporotic patients will develop post-traumatic arthritis, specifically limited radial deviation and wrist flexion. This arthritis can worsen over time. Displaced fractures of the ulnar styloid base associated with a distal radius fracture result in instability of the DRUJ and resulting loss of forearm rotation.

Nerve injury, especially of the median nerve and presenting as carpal tunnel syndrome, is commonly reported following distal radius fractures. Tendon injury can occur in people treated both nonoperatively and operatively, most commonly to the extensor pollicis longus tendon. This can be due to the tendon coming in contact with protruding bone or with hardware placed following surgical procedures.

Complex regional pain syndrome is also associated with distal radius fractures, and can present with pain, swelling, changes in color and temperature, and/or joint contracture. The cause for this condition is unknown.

== Cause ==
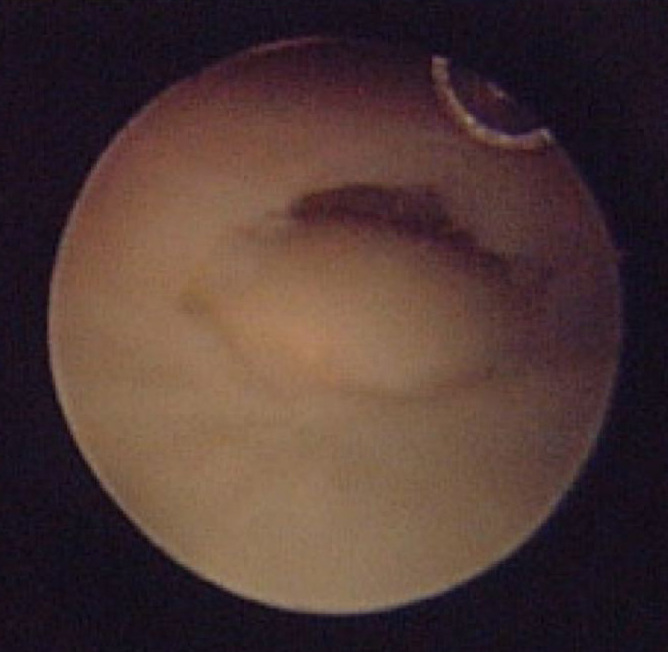
Arthroscopic image of a central triangular fibrocartilage complex tear

The most common cause of this type of fracture is a fall on an outstretched hand from standing height, although some fractures will be due to high-energy injury. People who fall on the outstretched hand are usually fitter and have better reflexes when compared to those with elbow or humerus fractures. The characteristics of distal radius fractures are influenced by the position of the hand at the time of impact, the type of surface at point of contact, the speed of the impact, and the strength of the bone. Distal radius fractures typically occur with the wrist bent back from 60 to 90 degrees. Radial styloid fracture would occur if the wrist is ulnar deviated and vice versa. If the wrist is bent back less, then proximal forearm fracture would occur, but if the bending back is more, then the carpal bones fracture would occur. With increased bending back, more force is required to produce a fracture. More force is required to produce a fracture in males than females. Risk of injury increases in those with osteoporosis.

Common injuries associated with distal radius fractures are interosseous intercarpal ligaments injuries, especially scapholunate (4.7% to 46% of cases) and lunotriquetral ligaments (12% to 34% of cases) injuries. There is an increased risk of interosseous intercarpal injury if the ulnar variance (the difference in height between the distal end of the ulna and the distal end of the radius) is more than 2mm and there is fracture into the wrist joint. Triangular fibrocartilage complex (TFCC) injury occurs in 39% to 82% of cases. Ulnar styloid process fracture increases the risk of TFCC injury by a factor of 5:1. However, it is unclear whether intercarpal ligaments and triangular fibrocartilage injuries are associated with long term pain and disability for those who are affected.

== Diagnosis ==
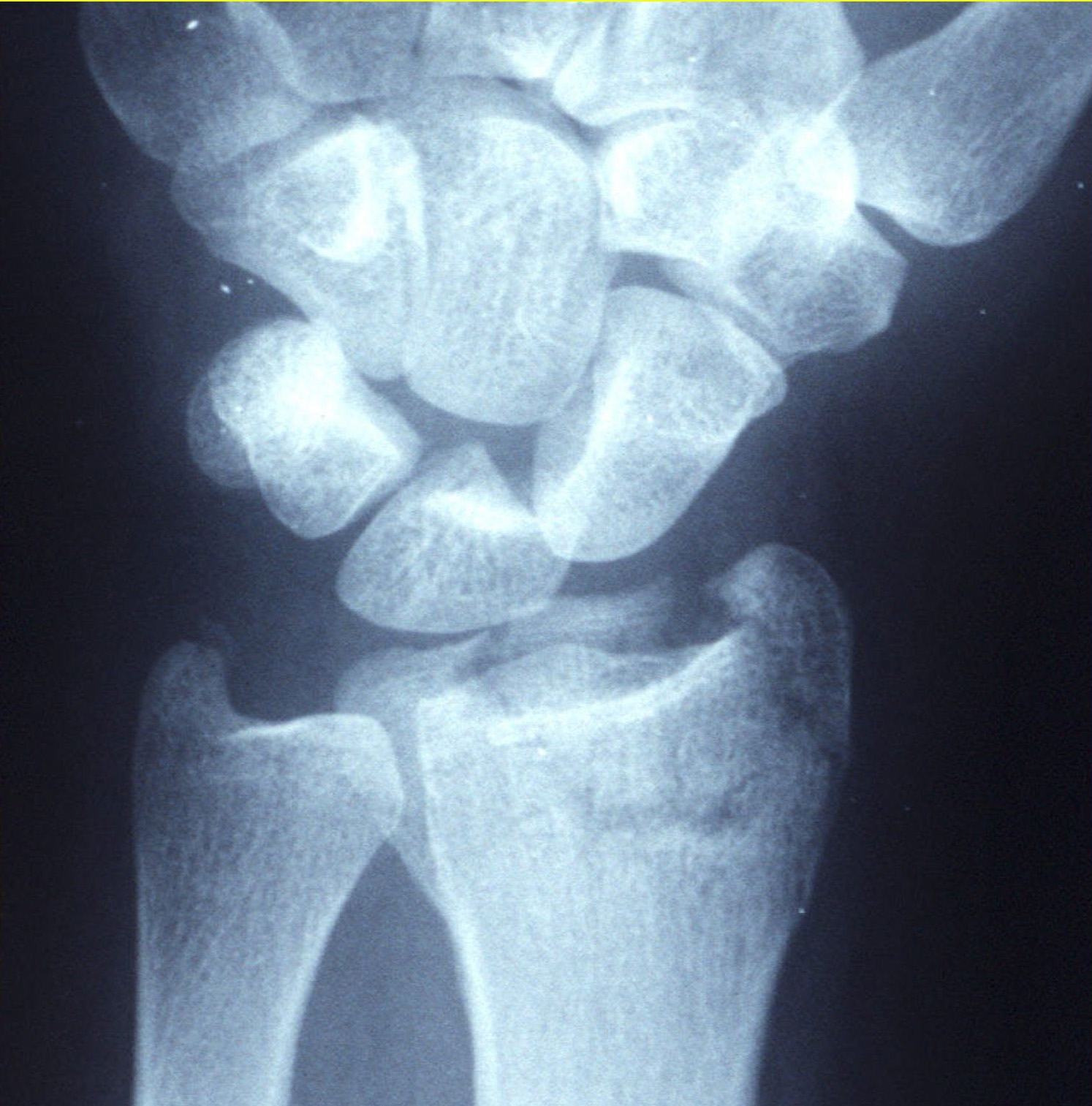
X-ray of a displaced intra-articular distal radius fracture in an external fixator: The articular surface is widely displaced and irregular.

Diagnosis may be evident clinically when the distal radius is deformed, but should be confirmed by X-ray. The differential diagnosis includes scaphoid fractures and wrist dislocations, which can also co-exist with a distal radius fracture. Occasionally, fractures may not be seen on X-rays immediately after the injury. Delayed X-rays, X-ray computed tomography (CT scan), or Magnetic resonance imaging (MRI) can confirm the diagnosis.

=== Medical imaging ===
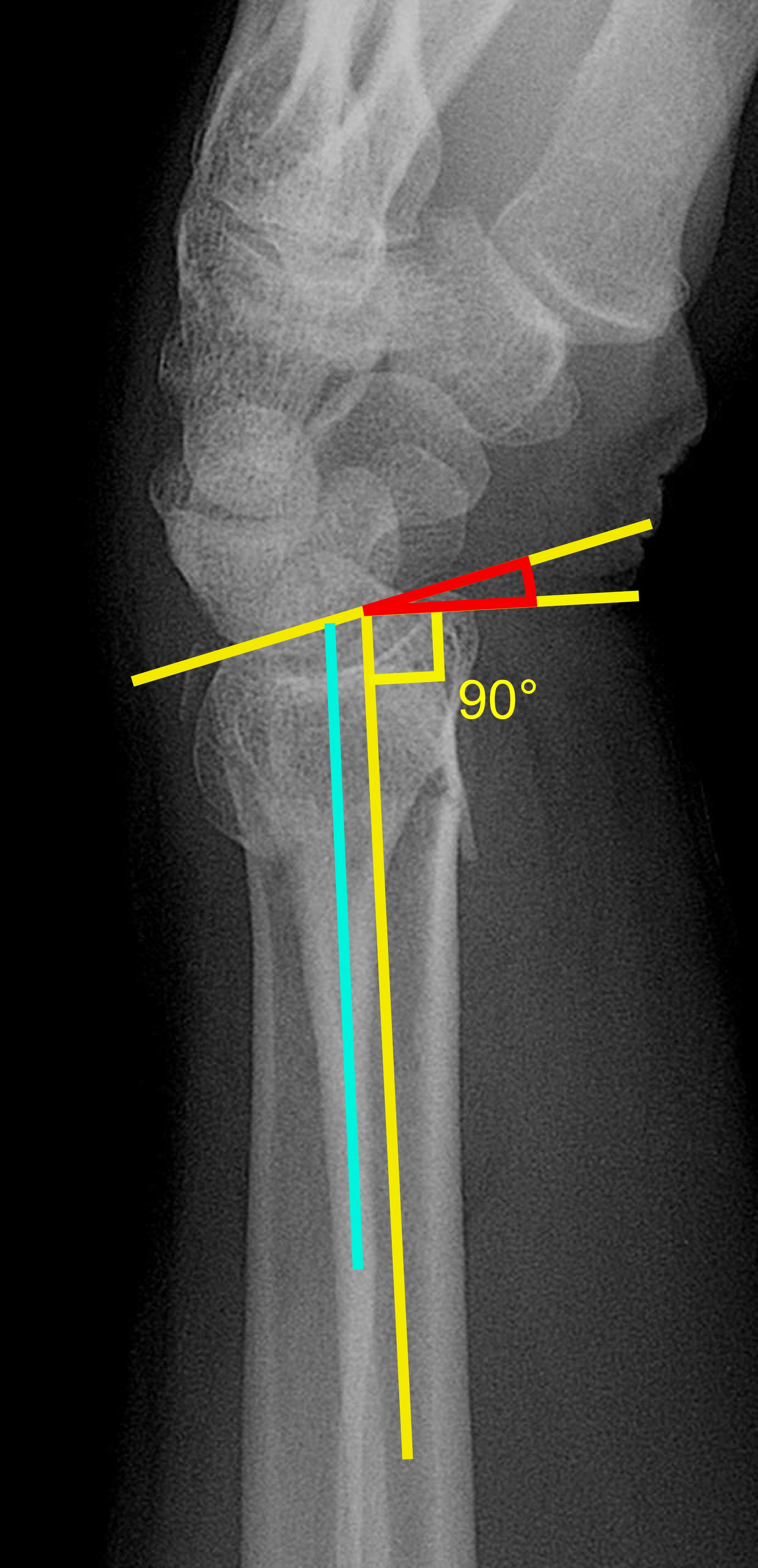
Fracture with a dorsal tilt: Dorsal is left, and volar is right in the image.

X-ray of the affected wrist is required if a fracture is suspected. Posteroanterior, lateral, and oblique views can be used together to describe the fracture. X-ray of the uninjured wrist should also be taken to determine if any normal anatomic variations exist before surgery.

A CT scan is often performed to further investigate the articular anatomy of the fracture, especially for fracture and displacement within the distal radio-ulnar joint.

Various kinds of information can be obtained from X-rays of the wrist:

Lateral view

- Carpal malalignment - A line is drawn along the long axis of the capitate bone and another line is drawn along the long axis of the radius. If the carpal bones are aligned, both lines will intersect within the carpal bones. If the carpal bones are not aligned, both lines will intersect outside the carpal bones. Carpal malignment is frequently associated with dorsal or volar tilt of the radius and will have poor grip strength and poor forearm rotation.
- Tear drop angle - It is the angle between the line that pass through the central axis of the volar rim of the lunate facet of the radius and the line that pass through the long axis of the radius. Tear drop angle less than 45 degrees indicates displacement of lunate facet.
- Antero-posterior distance (AP distance) - Seen on lateral X-ray, it is the distance between the dorsal and volar rim of the lunate facet of the radius. The usual distance is 19 mm. Increased AP distance indicates the lunate facet fracture.
- Volar or dorsal tilt - A line is drawn joining the most distal ends of the volar and dorsal side of the radius. Another line perpendicular to the longitudinal axis of the radius is drawn. The angle between the two lines is the angle of volar or dorsal tilt of the wrist. Measurement of volar or dorsal tilt should be made in true lateral view of the wrist because pronation of the forearm reduces the volar tilt and supination increases it. When dorsal tilt is more than 11 degrees, it is associated with loss of grip strength and loss of wrist flexion.

Posteroanterior view

- Radial inclination - It is the angle between a line drawn from the radial styloid to the medial end of the articular surface of the radius and a line drawn perpendicular to the long axis of the radius. Loss of radial inclination is associated with loss of grip strength.
- Radial length - It is the vertical distance in millimetres between a line tangential to the articular surface of the ulna and a tangential line drawn at the most distal point of radius (radial styloid). Shortening of radial length more than 4mm is associated with wrist pain.
- Ulnar variance - It is the vertical distance between a horizontal line parallel to the articular surface of the radius and another horizontal line drawn parallel to the articular surface of the ulnar head. Positive ulnar variance (ulna appears longer than radius) disturbs the integrity of triangular fibrocartilage complex and is associated with loss of grip strength and wrist pain.

Oblique view

- Pronated oblique view of the distal radius helps to show the degree of comminution of the distal end radius, depression of the radial styloid, and confirming the position the screws at the radial side of the distal end radius. Meanwhile, a supinated oblique view of shows the ulnar side of the distal radius, accessing the depression of dorsal rim of the lunate facet, and the position of the screws on the ulnar side of the distal end radius.

=== Classification ===
There are many classification systems for distal radius fracture. AO/OTA classification is adopted by Orthopaedic Trauma Association and is the most commonly used classification system. There are three major groups: A—extra-articular, B—partial articular, and C—complete articular which can further subdivided into nine main groups and 27 subgroups depending on the degree of communication and direction of displacement. However, none of the classification systems demonstrate good liability. A qualification modifier (Q) is used for associated ulnar fracture.

For children and adolescents, there are three main categories of fracture: buckle (torus) fractures, greenstick fractures, and complete (or off-ended) fractures. Buckle fractures are an incomplete break in the bone that involves the cortex (outside) of the bone. Buckle fractures are stable and are the most common type. Greenstick fractures are a bone that is broken only on one side and the bone bows to the other side. Greenstick fractures are unstable and often occur in younger children. Complete fractures, where the bone is completely broken, are unstable. In a complete fracture the bone can be misaligned. For a complete fracture, a closed fractures are those in which the skin and tissue lying over the bone is intact. An open fracture (exposed bone) is a serious injury.

== Treatment ==
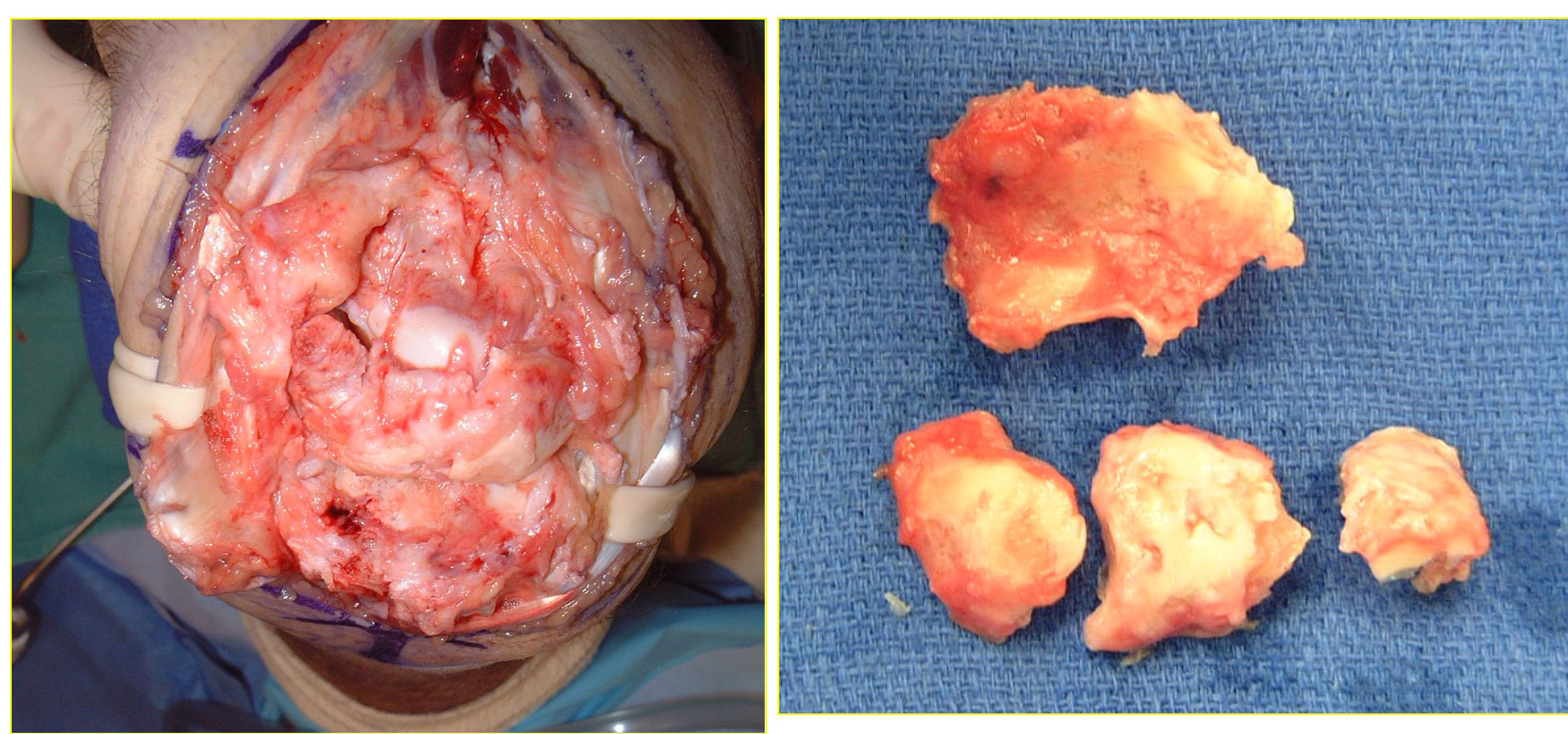
Posttraumatic arthritis of the wrist, degeneration of the articular surface before and after resection

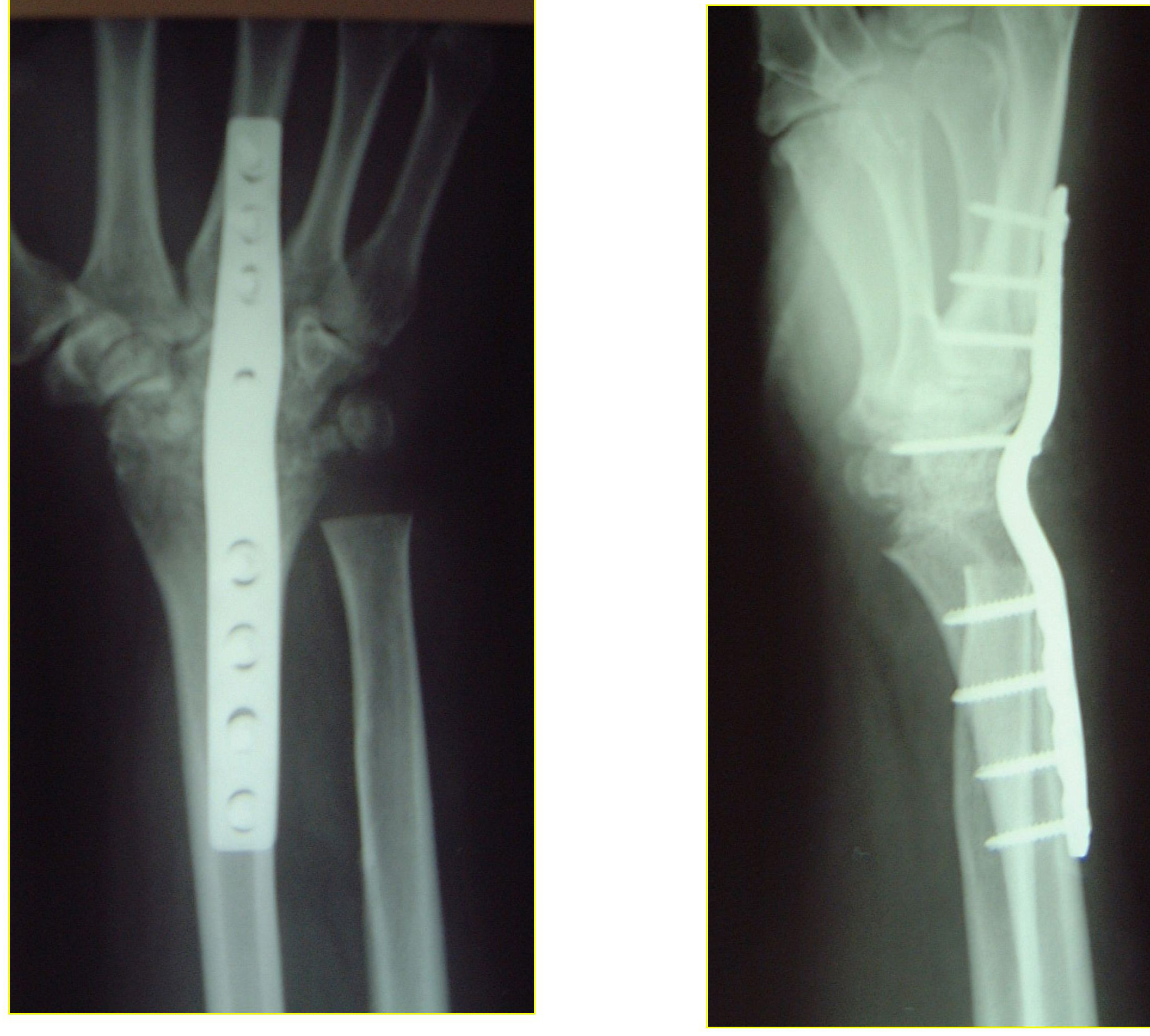
X-rays of a wrist fusion

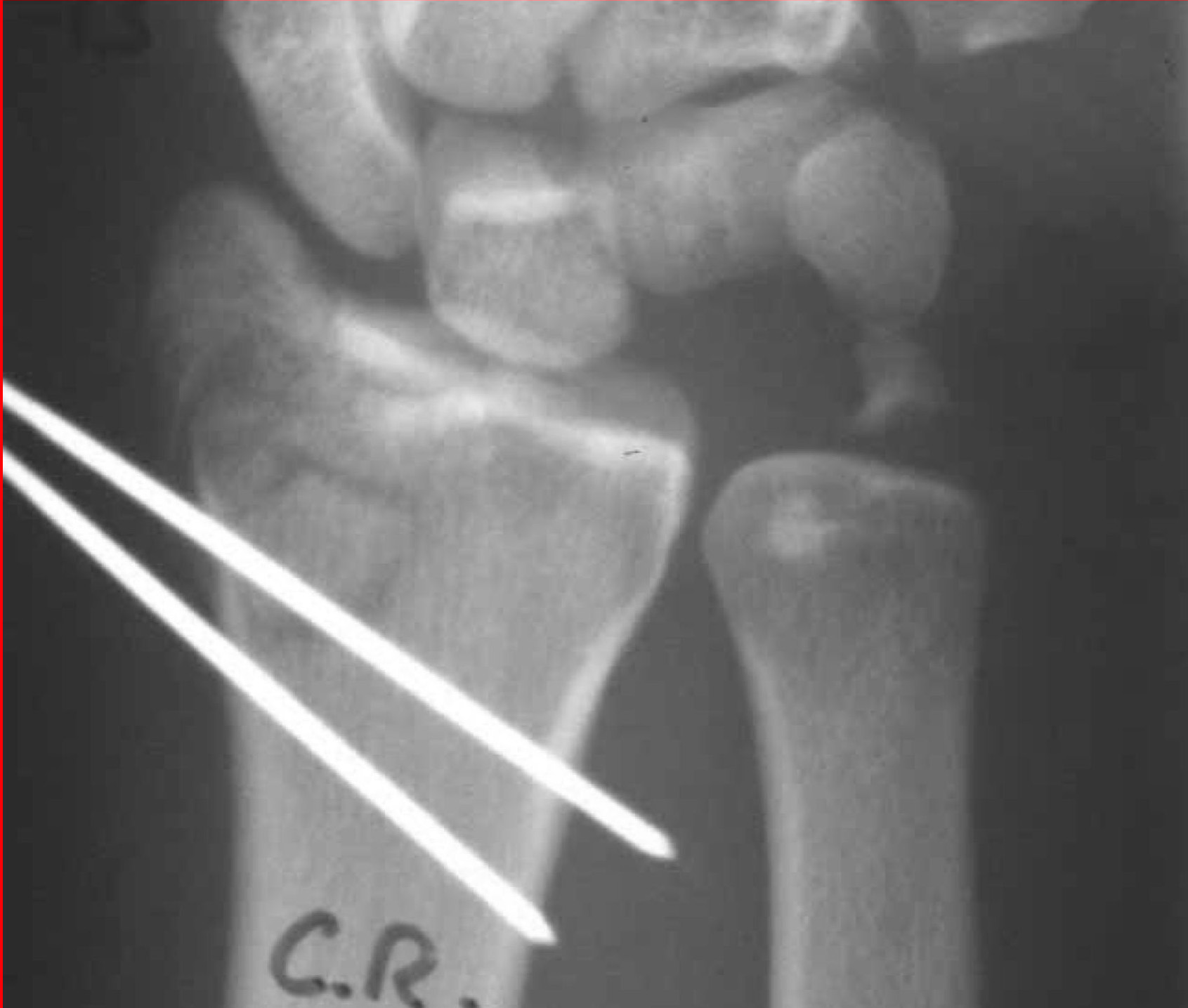
X-rays of pins across a distal radius fracture: Notice the ulnar styloid base fracture, which has not been fixed. This patient has instability of the DRUJ because the TFCC is not in continuity with the ulna.

Correction should be undertaken if the wrist radiology falls outside the acceptable limits:

- 2-3mm positive ulnar variance
- There should be no carpus malalignment
- If carpus is aligned, then the dorsal tilt should be less than 10 degrees
- If carpus is aligned, there are no limits for palmar tilt
- If carpus is malaligned, wrist tilt should be neutral
- Gap or step deformity is less than 2mm

Treatment options for distal radius fractures include nonoperative management, external fixation, and internal fixation. Indications for each depend on a variety of factors such as the patient's age, initial fracture displacement, and metaphyseal and articular alignment, with the ultimate goal to maximize strength and function in the affected upper extremity. Surgeons use these factors combined with radiologic imaging to predict fracture instability, and functional outcome to help decide which approach would be most appropriate. Treatment is often directed to restore normal anatomy to avoid the possibility of malunion, which may cause decreased strength in the hand and wrist. The decision to pursue a specific type of management varies greatly by geography, physician specialty (hand surgeons vs. orthopedic surgeons), and advancements in new technology such as the volar locking plating system.

Distal radius fractures are often associated with distal radial ulnar joint (DRUJ) injuries, and the American Academy of Orthopaedic Surgeons recommends that postreduction lateral wrist X-rays should be obtained in all patients with distal radius fractures in order to preclude DRUJ injuries or dislocations.

Most children with these types of fractures do not need surgery.

=== Nonoperative ===
The majority of distal radius fractures are treated with conservative nonoperative management, which involves immobilization through application of plaster or splint with or without closed reduction. The prevalence of nonoperative approach to distal radius fractures is around 70%. Nonoperative management is indicated for fractures that are undisplaced, or for displaced fractures that are stable following reduction. Variations in immobilization techniques involve the type of cast, position of immobilization, and the length of time required in the cast.

==== Undisplaced fractures ====
For those with low demand, cast and splint can be applied for two weeks. In those who are young and active, if the fracture is not displaced, the patient can be followed up in one week. If the fracture is still undisplaced, cast and splint can be applied for three weeks. If the fracture is displaced, then manipulative reduction or surgical stabilisation is required. Shorter immobilization is associated with better recovery when compared to prolonged immobilization. 10% of the minimally displaced fractures will become unstable in the first two weeks and cause malunion. Therefore, follow up within the first week of fracture is important. 22% of the minimally displaced fractures will malunite after two weeks. Subsequent follow ups at two to three weeks are therefore also important. There is weak evidence to suggest that some children with a buckle fracture may not require cast immobilization.

Where the fracture is undisplaced and stable, nonoperative treatment involves immobilization. Initially, a backslab or a sugar tong splint is applied to allow swelling to expand and subsequently a cast is applied. Depending on the nature of the fracture, the cast may be placed above the elbow to control forearm rotation. However, an above-elbow cast may cause long-term rotational contracture. For torus fractures, a splint may be sufficient and casting may be avoided. The position of the wrist in cast is usually slight flexion and ulnar deviation. However, neutral and dorsiflex position may not affect the stability of the fracture.

==== Displaced fractures ====
In displaced distal radius fracture, in those with low demands, the hand can be cast until the person feels comfortable. If the fracture affects the median nerve, only then is a reduction indicated. If the instability risk is less than 70%, the hand can be manipulated under regional block or general anaesthesia to achieve reduction. If the post reduction radiology of the wrist is acceptable, then the person can come for follow up at one, two, or three weeks to look for any displacement of fractures during this period. If the reduction is maintained, then the cast should continue for 4 to 6 weeks. If the fracture is displaced, surgical management is the proper treatment. If the instability risk of the wrist is more than 70%, then surgical management is required. 43% of displaced fractures will be unstable within the first two weeks and 47% of the remaining unstable fractures will become unstable after two weeks. Therefore, periodic reviews are important to prevent malunion of the displaced fractures.

Closed reduction of a distal radius fracture involves first anesthetizing the affected area with a hematoma block, intravenous regional anesthesia (Bier's block), sedation or a general anesthesia. Manipulation generally includes first placing the arm under traction and unlocking the fragments. The deformity is then reduced with appropriate closed manipulative (depending on the type of deformity) reduction, after which a splint or cast is placed and an X-ray is taken to ensure that the reduction was successful. The cast is usually maintained for about 6 weeks.

==== Outcome of nonoperative treatment ====
Failure of nonoperative treatment leading to functional impairment and anatomic deformity is the largest risk associated with conservative management. Prior studies have shown that the fracture often redisplaces to its original position even in a cast. Only 27-32% of fractures are in acceptable alignment 5 weeks after closed reduction. For those less than 60 years in age, there will be a dorsal angulation of 13 degrees, while for those older than 60, the dorsal angulation can reach as high as 18 degrees. In people over 60, functional impairment can last for more than 10 years.

Despite these risks with nonoperative treatment, more recent systematic reviews suggest that when indicated, nonsurgical management in the elderly population may lead to similar functional outcomes as surgical approaches. In these studies, no significant differences in pain scores, grip strength, and range of motion in patients' wrists occurred when comparing conservative nonsurgical approaches with surgical management. Although the nonsurgical group exhibited greater anatomic misalignment such as radial deviation, and ulnar variance, these changes did not seem to have significant impact on overall pain and quality of life.

=== Surgery ===
Surgery is generally indicated for displaced or unstable fractures. The techniques of surgical management include open reduction internal fixation (ORIF), external fixation, percutaneous pinning, or some combination of the above. The choice of operative treatment is often determined by the type of fracture, which can be categorized broadly into three groups: partial articular fractures, displaced articular fractures, and metaphyseal unstable extra- or minimal articular fractures.

Significant advances have been made in ORIF treatments. Two newer treatments are fragment-specific fixation and fixed-angle volar plating. These attempt fixation rigid enough to allow almost immediate mobility, in an effort to minimize stiffness and improve ultimate function; no improved final outcome from early mobilization (prior to 6 weeks after surgical fixation) has been shown. Although restoration of radiocarpal alignment is thought to be of obvious importance, the exact amount of angulation, shortening, intra-articular gap/step which impact final function are not exactly known. The alignment of the DRUJ is also important, as this can be a source of a pain and loss of rotation after final healing and maximum recovery.

An arthroscope can be used at the time of fixation to evaluate for soft-tissue injury and the congruity of the joint surface and may increase the accuracy of joint surface alignment Structures at risk include the triangular fibrocartilage complex and the scapholunate ligament. Scapholunate injuries in radial styloid fractures where the fracture line exits distally at the scapholunate interval should be considered. TFCC injuries causing obvious DRUJ instability can be addressed at the time of fixation.

Prognosis varies depending on dozens of variables. If the anatomy (bony alignment) is not properly restored, function may remain poor even after healing. Restoration of bony alignment is not a guarantee of success, as soft tissue contributes significantly to the healing process.

==== Little joint involvement ====
These fractures are the most common of the three groups mentioned above that require surgical management. A minimal articular fracture involves the joint, but does not require reduction of the joint. Manipulative reduction and immobilization were thought to be appropriate for metaphyseal unstable fractures. However, several studies suggest this approach is largely ineffective in patients with high functional demand, and in this case, more stable fixation techniques should be used.

Surgical options have been shown to be successful in patients with unstable extra-articular or minimal articular distal radius fractures. These options include percutaneous pinning, external fixation, and ORIF using plating. Patients with low functional demand of their wrists can be treated successfully with nonsurgical management; however, in more active and fit patients with fractures that are reducible by closed means, nonbridging external fixation is preferred, as it has less serious complications when compared to other surgical options. The most common complication associated with nonbridging external fixation is pin tract infection, which can be managed with antibiotics and frequent dressing changes, and rarely results in reoperation. The external fixator is placed for 5 to 6 weeks and can be removed in an outpatient setting.

If the fractures are unlikely to be reduced by closed means, open reduction with internal plate fixation is preferred. Although major complications (i.e. tendon injury, fracture collapse, or malunion) result in higher reoperation rates (36.5%) compared to external fixation (6%), ORIF is preferred, as this provides better stability and restoration of the volar tilt. Following the operation, a removable splint is placed for 2 weeks, during which time patients should mobilize the wrist as tolerated.

==== Displaced intra-articular fractures ====
These fractures, although less common, often require surgery in active, healthy patients to address displacement of both the joint and the metaphysis. The two mainstays of treatment are bridging external fixation or ORIF. If reduction can be achieved by closed/percutaneous reduction, then open reduction can generally be avoided. Percutaneous pinning is preferred to plating due to similar clinical and radiological outcomes, as well as lower costs, when compared to plating, despite increased risk of superficial infections. Level of joint restoration, as opposed to surgical technique, has been found to be a better indicator of functional outcomes.

== Outcome ==
World Health Organization (WHO) divides outcomes into three categories: impairment, disabilities, and handicaps. Impairment is the abnormal physical function, such as lack of forearm rotation. It is measured clinically. Disability is the lack of ability to perform physical daily activities. It is measured by Patient Reported Outcome Measures (PROMs). Examples of scoring system based on clinical assessment are: Mayo Wrist Score (for perilunate fracture dislocation), Green and O'Brien Score (carpal dislocation and pain), and Gartland and Werley Score (evaluating distal radius fractures). These scores includes assessment of range of motion, grip strength, ability to perform activities of daily living, and radiological picture. However, none of the three scoring system demonstrated good reliability.

There are also two scoring systems for Patient Reported Outcome Measures (PROMs): the Disabilities of Hand, Arm and Shoulder (DASH) Score and the Patient-Related Wrist Evaluation (PRWE) Score. These scoring systems measures the ability of a person to perform a task, pain score, presence of tingling and numbness, the effect on activities of daily living, and self-image. Both scoring systems show good reliability and validity.

=== Age factor ===
In children, the outcome of distal radius fracture is usually very good with healing and return to normal function expected. Some residual deformity is common, but this often remodels as the child grows.

In young patients, the injury requires greater force and results in more displacement, particularly to the articular surface. Unless an accurate reduction of the joint surface is obtained, these patients are very likely to have long-term symptoms of pain, arthritis, and stiffness.

In the elderly, distal radius fractures heal and may result in adequate function following nonoperative treatment. A large proportion of these fractures occur in elderly people who may have less requirement for strenuous use of their wrists. Some of these patients tolerate severe deformities and minor loss of wrist motion very well, even without reduction of the fracture. There is no difference in functional outcomes between operative and non-operative management in the elderly age group, despite better anatomical results in the operative group.

== Epidemiology ==
Distal radius fractures are the most common fractures seen in adults and children. Distal radius fractures account for 18% of all adult fractures with an approximate rate of 23.6 to 25.8 per 100,000 per year. For children, both boys and girls have a similar incidence of these types of fractures, however the peak ages differ slightly. Girls peak at 11 years old and boys peak at 14 years old (the age that children experience the most fractures). For adults, incidences in females outnumber incidences in males by a factor of three to two. In adults, the average age of occurrence is between 57 and 66 years. Men who sustain distal radius fractures are usually younger, generally in their 40s (vs. 60s in females). Low energy injury (usually fall from standing height) is the usual cause of distal end radius fracture (66 to 77% of cases). High energy injuries accounts for 10% of wrist fractures. About 57% to 66% of the fractures are extra-articular fractures, 9% to 16% are partial-articular fractures, and 25% to 35% are complete articular fractures. Unstable metaphyseal fractures are ten times more common than severe articular fractures. Older people with osteoporosis who are still active are at an increased risk of getting distal radius fractures.

== History ==
Before the 18th century, distal radius fracture was believed to be due to dislocation of the carpal bones or the displacement of the distal radioulnar articulation. In the 18th century, Petit first suggested that these types of injuries might be due to fractures rather than dislocations. Another author, Pouteau, suggested the common mechanism of injury which leads to this type of fractures - injury to the wrist when a person falls on an outstretched hand with dorsal displacement of the wrist. However, he also suggested that volar displacement of the wrist was due to the ulnar fracture. His work was met with skepticism from colleagues and little recognition, since the article was published after he died. In 1814, Abraham Colles described the characteristics of distal end radius fracture. In 1841, Guilaume Dupuytren acknowledged the contributions by Petit and Pouteau, agreeing that the distal end radius fracture is indeed a fracture, not a dislocation. In 1847, Malgaigne described the mechanism of injury for distal end radius fractures that can be caused by falling on the outstretched hand or on the back of the hand and also the consequences if the hand fracture is not treated adequately. After that, Robert William Smith, professor of surgery in Dublin, Ireland, first described the characteristics of volar displacement of distal radius fractures. In 1895, with the advent of X-rays, the visualisation of the distal radius fracture became more apparent. Lucas-Champonnière first described the management of fractures using massage and early mobilization techniques. Anaesthesia, aseptic technique, immobilization and external fixation have all contributed to the management of fixation of distal radius fracture. Ombredanne, a Parisian surgeon in 1929, first reported the use of nonbridging external fixation in the management of distal radius fractures. Bridging external fixation was introduced by Roger Anderson and Gordon O'Neill from Seattle in 1944 due to poor results in conservative management (using orthopaedic cast) of distal end radius fractures. Raoul Hoffman of Geneva designed orthopaedic clamps, which allow adjustments of the external fixator to reduce the fractures by closed reduction. In 1907, percutaneous pinning was first used. This was followed by the use of plating in 1965.
