= Nissen-Lie classification =

Colles' fracture classification system

Nissen-Lie classification is a system of categorizing Colles' fractures. In the Nissen-Lie classification system, there are seven types of fractures. The classification system was first published in 1939.

== Classification ==
- Type 1: A fracture at the junction of the shaft and distal extremity of the radius (occurs only in children between the age of 1 and 15 years, and is most commonly a greenstick fracture)
- Type 2: Slipping of the epiphysis with dorsal displacement, often with a dorsally avulsed triangular fragment of the radius (occurs in the age range 10-20 years)
- Type 3: Minimal displacement
- Type 4: Dorsal angulation, extra-articular, no comminution
- Type 5: Intra-articular, comminuted
- Type 6: Fractures of the radial styloid
- Type 7: Fractures with dorsal displacement

== See also ==
- Frykman classification
- Gartland & Werley classification
- Lidström classification
- Older's classification
