= Claude Pouteau =

French surgeon and inventor (1724–1775)

Claude Pouteau (born August 14, 1724, in Lyon, and died February 10, 1775, in the same city) was a French surgeon and inventor.

== Biography ==
Claude Pouteau was the son of a surgeon, from whom he received his first medical education. He then studied in Paris, where he had as masters Jean-Louis Petit, Henri François Le Dran and Sauveur François Morand. Once his thesis was defended, he returned to Lyon, where he was appointed junior surgeon at the Hôtel-Dieu in 1744. He succeeded Pierre Grassot as major surgeon at the Hôtel-Dieu and continued, like the latter, to promote vaccination against smallpox. In 1753 he turned to private practice, where he was very successful.

In 1755 he was made a member of the Academy of Sciences, Belles-Lettres et Arts de Lyon.

Pouteau was a very human doctor. For example, he put an end to the lithotomy operations performed in a row (the spectators saw several operations, but the patients were waiting amidst the cries of those who preceded them). Yet it was Pouteau who, for his use of fire, was accused of cruelty by its competitors.

He died of a skull fracture following a fall.

== Contributions ==
=== Observations ===
Pouteau made numerous observations on cancer, on fire in the treatment of rheumatism and other diseases, on the properties of the pores of the skin, on pulmonary tuberculosis and on the rickets.

=== Asepsis before the letter ===
A century before Ignaz Semmelweis, Pouteau understood that, in hospitals, infection was not transmitted only through the air, but through direct contact with the surgeon's hands, dressings and instruments and he deduced asepsis measures.

It's not just the unsanitary air that he blames for cases of gangrene or "pourriture d'hôpital" ("hospital rot") (which often turned minor injuries into serious disabilities). Against what he calls the "gangrenous virus", he prescribes:

- that the hands of surgeons and caregivers are washed;
- that single-use paper or cardboard be used in dressings;
- that the linen used for dressings is no longer reused for this purpose;
- that the lint be made outside the hospital by clean hands and brought in gradually.

=== Forearm fractures ===
Pouteau described a wide variety of forearm fractures. It is sometimes said that he was the first to describe the Colles' fracture (which is sometimes called the Pouteau-Colles fracture), but, according to P. Liverneaux, it is not the case.

== Achievements ==
=== Inventions and processes ===
- Lithotome at the level ("taille au niveau").
- Incision through the inside of the eyelid (to avoid visible scars) in the case of obstruction of the lacrimal passages.
- "Modifications in various operating areas: ligatures of the fr:omentum in strangulated hernia, dressings of fistulas in the anus, arterial ligatures in amputations, reduction of joint dislocations etc."

=== Works ===
==== Publications ====
- Mélanges de chirurgie, Lyon, Geofroy Regnault, 1760, online.
- Essai sur la rage, 1763, online.
- La taille au niveau. Mémoire sur la lithotomie par l'appareil latéral, circonstances et dépendances, avec addition de quelques nouveaux instruments pour cette opération, Avignon, 1765, online.
- Œuvres posthumes, edited and enlarged by Jean Colombier, 1783: t.1 online; 2 online; t. 3 online.
- Claude Pouteau and Georg Ludwig Rumpelt, Vermischte Schrifften von der Wundarzneykunst, Dresden and Warsaw, 1764.

==== Manuscript ====
- At Duke University.

== Bibliography ==
- Avis d'un serviteur d'Esculape, sur les Mélanges de chirurgie : aux citoyens de Lyon, 1761, online. (Hostile to Pouteau.)
- L. J. Bégin, "“Pouteau (Claude)", in Nicolas Philibert Adelon, Dictionnaire des sciences médicales, t. 6, Paris, Panckoucke, 1812, p. 490, online.
- Louis Paul Fischer et Khadija Touil, "Claude Pouteau (1725-1775), chirurgien de l'Hôtel-Dieu de Lyon : son asepsie au moyen de l'eau, du feu et du linge propre", in Histoire des sciences médicales, 1998, vol. 32, no. 1, p. 27–37, online.
- fr:Charles Ozanam, article "Pouteau (Claude)", in Louis-Gabriel Michaud, Ancient and modern universal biography, t. 34, Desplaces, p. 250, online.
- Khadija Touil, Contribution à la biographie de Claude Pouteau (1725–1775), chirurgien-major de l'hôtel-Dieu de Lyon, thesis under the supervision of Louis Paul Fischer, 1996.
- Pierre Crépel and Jean-Pierre Hanno Neidhardt, "Claude Pouteau", in Dominique Saint-Pierre (dir.) Dictionnaire historique des académiciens de Lyon 1700-2016, Lyon, Éditions de l'Académie (4, rue Adolphe Max, 69005 Lyon), 2017, p. 1071-1074.
- (Mainstream press) "Claude Pouteau, un pionnier de la chirurgie lyonnaise", Le Progrès, August 31, 2014, online.

== Iconography ==
- Bust by Jean-François Legendre-Héral, a sculptor from Montpellier, at one of the corners of the dome of the Hôtel-Dieu de Lyon.
- Engraving by Augustin de Saint-Aubin.
