= Robert William Smith (surgeon) =

Irish surgeon and pathologist (1807–1873)

Robert William Smith MD FRCSI MRIA (12 October 1807 in Dublin – 28 October 1873) was an Irish surgeon and pathologist who described Smith's fracture in his 1847 book, the first important book on fractures by an Irish author.

== Biography ==
Smith studied medicine in his native Dublin and he was apprenticed to Richard Carmichael, and he studied professionally in the RCSI Medical School, Trinity College, the Richmond Hospital Schools, and in the House of Industry Hospitals. Smith received his Licentiate of the Royal College of Surgeons in Ireland (RCSI) in 1832. He was awarded his MD from Trinity College, Dublin in 1842, and became a Fellow of the Royal College of Surgeons in Ireland (RCSI) in 1844. He became the first Professor of Surgery at Trinity College in 1847, and a member of the Royal Irish Academy in 1849. He worked as surgeon to the Hospital for the Mentally Ill, Sir Patrick Dun's Hospital and he taught surgery and forensic medicine at the Richmond Hospital. He co-founded the Dublin Pathological Society in 1838 with Abraham Colles, Sir Dominic Corrigan and William Stokes.

Robert Smith published on a wide variety of subjects, particularly the pathology of surgical diseases, congenital joint dislocations and neuroma. Cameron in his History of the RCSI claims that Smith was one of the most distinguished anatomists and surgeons of his time. In his 1847 book A Treatise on Fractures in the Vicinity of Joints and on Certain Forms of Accidental and Congenital Dislocations he corrected Colles's description of the Colles' fracture, stating that

"The situation of the fracture is not so high as Mr. Colles states it to be; I have never seen it more than an inch above the carpal end of the bone; in the majority of cases it is not so much".

Smith also described his own eponymous fracture in the same chapter. In his Treatise on the Pathology, Diagnosis and Treatment of Neuroma he described neurofibromatosis 33 years before von Recklinghausen.

Robert William Smith died on 28 October 1873. He was Vice-President of the Royal College of Surgeons in Ireland (RCSI) at the time.
