= Robert William Smith =

Robert William Smith may refer to:

- Robert W. Smith (writer) (1926–2011), American martial artist and writer
- Robert W. Smith (musician) (1958), American composer and arranger
- Robert William Smith (politician) (1871–1958), New Zealand Liberal Party politician
- Robert William Smith (surgeon) (1807–1873), Irish surgeon and pathologist
- Bobby Smith (footballer, born 1944), English footballer
