= Smith's fracture =

- Other names: Reverse Colles' fracture, Goyrand-Smith's
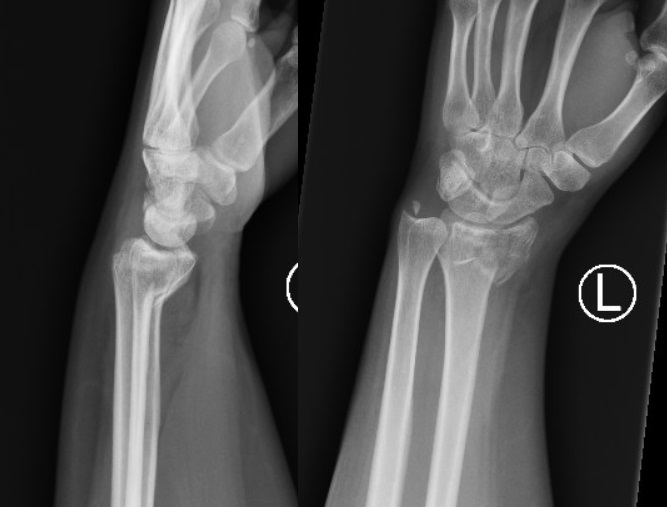
- Smith's fracture
- Specialty: Orthopedics

A Smith's fracture, is a fracture of the distal radius.

Although it can also be caused by a direct blow to the dorsal forearm or by a fall with the wrist flexed, the most common mechanism of injury for Smith's fracture occurs in a palmar fall with the wrist joint slightly dorsiflexed. Smith's fractures are less common than Colles' fractures.

The distal fracture fragment is displaced volarly (ventrally), as opposed to a Colles' fracture which the fragment is displaced dorsally. Depending on the severity of the impact, there may be one or many fragments and it may or may not involve the articular surface of the wrist joint.

== Classification ==
A commonly used classification of distal radial fractures is the Frykman classification:

- Type I: Extra-articular
- Type II: Type I, with fracture of distal ulna
- Type III: Radiocarpal joint involvement
- Type IV: Type III with fracture of distal ulna
- Type V: Distal radioulnar joint involved.
- Type VI: Type V with fracture of distal ulna
- Type VII: Radiocarpal and distal radioulnar joint both involved.
- Type VIII: Type VII with fracture of distal ulna.

== Presentation ==
=== Complications ===
The biggest concern is malunion of the wrist due to poor reduction or shortening of the distal radius. This can result in a permanent "garden-spade deformity".

There are also higher risks of carpal tunnel syndrome and osteoarthritis in patients with a previous Smith fractures.

Entrapment of the extensor pollicis longus can also occur in cases of non-union, and can result in late rupture of this tendon.

Complex regional pain syndrome can be reported in up to 40% of fractures.

== Diagnosis ==
=== Physical examination ===
Classic physical examination findings of a Smith's fracture is palmar displacement of the wrist that results in a "garden-spade deformity".

=== Investigation ===
Two views should be obtained: AP and lateral.

PA radiography will look very similar to a Colles' fracture, with a fracture along the distal metaphysis of the radius (can be shortened or comminuted). Lateral radiography will demonstrate volar angulation / displacement of the fracture.

== Treatment ==
Treatment of this fracture depends on the severity of the fracture. An undisplaced fracture may be treated with a cast alone. A fracture with mild angulation and displacement may require closed reduction (putting into place without surgery). Significant angulation and deformity may require an open reduction and internal fixation. An open fracture will always require surgical intervention.

Indications for operative management include dorsal or volar comminution, intra-articular involvement, instability post-reduction, angulation greater than 20 degrees, surface step-off over 2mm or shortening of the radius greater than 5mm.

For a closed reduction, the approach is the opposite of reductions completed for Colle's fractures. In the case of a Smith's fracture, the wrist must be reduced and splinted in extension.

== Eponym ==
This fracture is named after the orthopedic surgeon, Robert William Smith (1807–1873) in his book A Treatise on Fractures in the Vicinity of Joints, and on certain forms of Accidents and Congenital Dislocations published in 1847.
