= Gartland & Werley classification =

Colles' fracture classification system

Gartland & Werley classification is a system of categorizing Colles' fractures. In the Gartland & Werley classification system there are three types of fractures. The classification system is based on metaphysical comminution, intra-articular extension and displacement, and was first published in 1951.

== Classification ==
- Type 1: Extra-articular, displaced
- Type 2: Intra-articular, no displacement
- Type 3: Intra-articular, displaced

== See also ==
- Frykman classification
- Lidström classification
- Nissen-Lie classification
- Older's classification
