= Older's classification =

Older's classification is a system of categorizing Colles' fractures, proposed in 1965. In the Older's classification system there are four types of fractures.

== Classification ==
- Type 1: Dorsal angulation up to five degrees, radial length distal to ulna at least 7 mm.
- Type 2: Dorsal angulation, radial length 1 to 7 mm, no comminution.
- Type 3: Dorsal radius comminuted, radial length less than 4 mm, distal fragment slightly comminuted.
- Type 4: Marked comminution, radial length usually negative.

== See also ==
- Frykman classification
- Gartland & Werley classification
- Lidström classification
- Nissen-Lie classification
