= Lidström classification =

Lidström classification is a system of categorizing fractures of the distal radius, one of the two bones of the forearm. In the Lidström classification system there are six types of fractures. The classification system is based on fracture line, direction and degree of displacement, extent of articular involvement and involvement of the distal radioulnar joint, and was first published in 1959.

== Classification ==
- Group 1: Minimal displacement
- Group 2-A: Extra-articular, dorsal angulation
- Group 2-B: Intra-articular, dorsal angulation, joint surface not comminuted
- Group 2-C: Extra-articular, dorsal angulation and dorsal displacement
- Group 2-D: Intra-articular, dorsal angulation and displacement, joint surface not comminuted
- Group 2-E: Intra-articular, dorsal angulation and displacement, joint surface comminuted

== See also ==
- Frykman classification
- Gartland & Werley classification
- Nissen-Lie classification
- Older's classification
