= Greenstick fracture =

Common long bone fracture in children

Greenstick Fracture
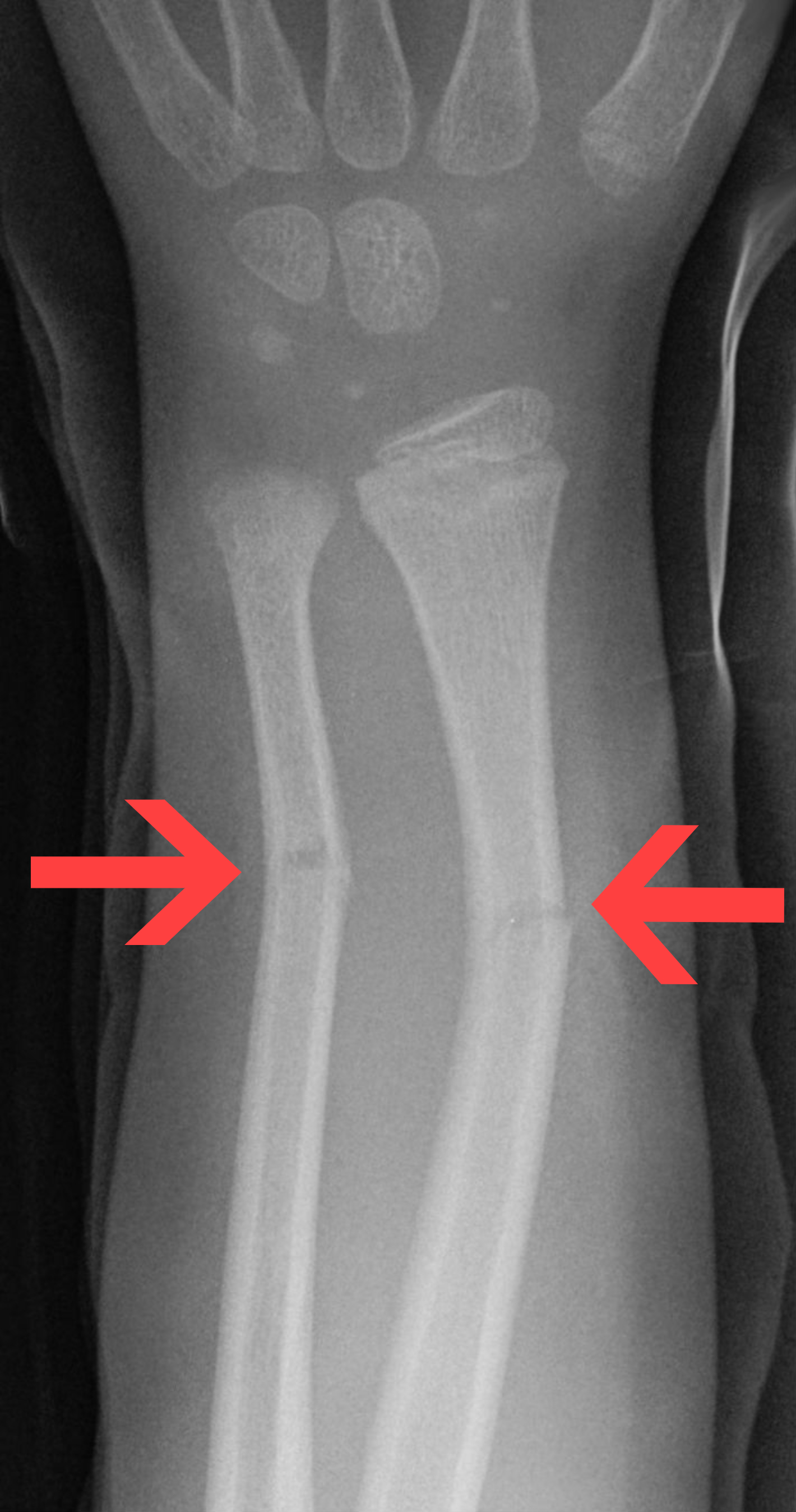
- Greenstick fractures on X-ray.
- A Orthopedic Cast used for Healing a Greenstick Fracture
- Specialty: Orthopedics; Pediatrics

A greenstick fracture is a partial bone break that typically occurs in children due to their more flexible and resilient bone composition. This fracture pattern is characterized by a break on one side of the bone while the other side remains intact and bends, similar to breaking a young, green tree branch. Greenstick fractures most commonly affect the long bones of the forearm (radius and ulna) but can also occur in other long bones throughout the body. Treatment generally involves immobilization with a cast to allow proper bone healing, though in some cases, it may be necessary to realign the bone before casting.

== Signs and symptoms ==
Children presenting with greenstick fractures typically exhibit localized pain, swelling, and tenderness over the affected area, with notable deformity that may be less pronounced than in complete fractures. The patient often presents with a history of fall or trauma and demonstrates limited range of motion in the affected limb, accompanied by reluctance to use or bear weight on the injured body part. Physical examination usually reveals point tenderness, mild to moderate angulation, and intact soft tissues without complete displacement of the bone fragments. Unlike complete fractures, crepitus (grating sensation) is typically absent due to the partial nature of the break, and there may be preservation of some periosteal continuity on the intact side of the bone. Pain is usually significantly less than other types of fractures, but in a young child may still be very distressing.

On the side of the fracture that underwent tension, imaging may show bone cortex disruption. On the side that underwent compression, cortex may bulge outward, similar to a torus fracture.

== Risk factors ==
The major risk factor for a greenstick fracture is young age. Children have softer bones, and engaged in sports and other activities that result in limb injury.

The greenstick fracture pattern occurs as a result of bending forces. Activities with a high risk of falling are risk factors. Non-accidental injury more commonly causes spiral (twisting) fractures but a blow on the forearm or shin could cause a greenstick fracture.

== Diagnosis ==
Greenstick fractures are usually identified with ease on X-ray of the affected limb, showing a long bone fracture that does not cut all the way through.

== Treatment ==
Treatment of greenstick fractures typically begins with reduction (realigning bone segments) if the bone portions on either side of the fracture form an angle, as opposed to being straight and already aligned. This is followed by the application of a well-molded cast that immobilizes the joints above and below the fracture site. A follow-up X-ray should be performed 7–10 days after cast application, to ensure proper bone alignment and healing progression. Occasionally, to correct an angular deformity, more advanced techniques may be necessary to assist bone remodeling.

Some experts recommend the use of simple splinting rather than a cast.

== Fossil record ==
Evidence for greenstick fractures found in the fossil record is studied by paleopathologists, specialists in ancient disease and injury. Greenstick fractures (willow breaks) have been reported in fossils of the large carnivorous dinosaur Allosaurus fragilis.

Greenstick fractures are found in the fossil remains of Lucy, the most famous specimen of Australopithecus afarensis, discovered in Ethiopia in 1974. Analysis of bone fracture patterns, which include a large number of greenstick fractures in the forearms, lower limbs, pelvis, thorax and skull, suggest that Lucy died from a vertical fall and impact with the ground.
