= Joint dislocation =

Medical injury

- Other names: Latin: luxatio
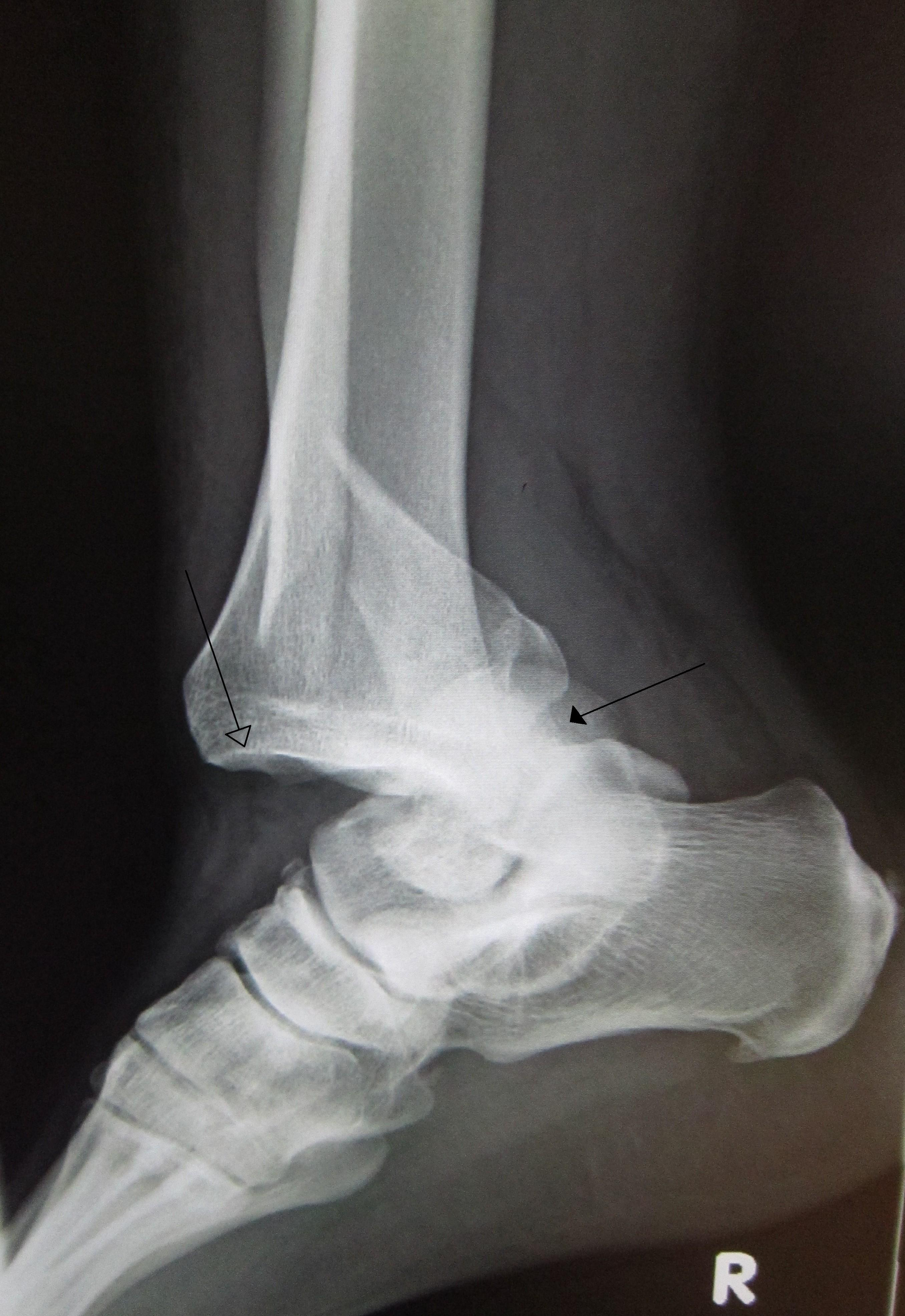
- A traumatic dislocation of the tibiotarsal joint of the ankle with distal fibular fracture. Open arrow marks the tibia and the closed arrow marks the talus.
- Specialty: Orthopedic surgery

A joint dislocation, also called luxation, occurs when there is an abnormal separation in a joint where two or more bones meet. A partial dislocation is referred to as a subluxation. Dislocations are commonly caused by sudden trauma to the joint — as during a car-accident or a fall. A joint dislocation can damage the surrounding ligaments, tendons, muscles, and nerves. Dislocations can occur in any major joint (shoulder, knees, hips) or minor joint (toes, fingers). The most common joint dislocation is a shoulder dislocation.

The treatment for joint dislocation usually involves closed reduction, that is, skilled manipulation to return the bones to their normal position. Only trained medical professionals should perform reductions, since the manipulation can cause injury to the surrounding soft tissue, nerves, or vascular structures.

== Signs and symptoms ==
The following symptoms are common with any type of dislocation.

- Intense pain
- Joint instability
- Deformity of the joint area
- Reduced muscle strength
- Bruising or redness of the joint area
- Difficulty moving joint
- Stiffness

=== Complications ===
Joint dislocations can have associated injuries to surrounding tissues and structures, including muscle strains, ligament and tendon injuries, neurovascular injuries, and fractures. Depending on the location of the dislocation, there are different complications to consider.

In the shoulder, vessel and nerve injuries are rare, but can cause many impairments and requires a longer recovery process. Knee dislocations are rare, but can be complicated by injuries to arteries and nerves, leading to limb-threatening complications. Degenerative changes following injury to the wrist are common, with many developing arthritis. Persistent nerve pain years after the initial trauma is not uncommon. Most finger dislocations occur in the middle of the finger (PIP) and are complicated by ligamentous injury (volar plate). Since most dislocations involving the joint near the fingertip (DIP joint) are due to trauma, there is often an associated fracture or tissue injury. Hip dislocations are at risk for osteonecrosis of the femoral head, femoral head fractures, the development of osteoarthritis, and sciatic nerve injury. Given the strength of ligaments in the foot and ankle, ankle dislocation-fractures can occur.

== Causes ==
Joint dislocations are caused by trauma to the joint or when an individual falls on a specific joint. Great and sudden force applied, by either a blow or fall, to the joint can cause the bones in the joint to be displaced or dislocated from their normal position. With each dislocation, the ligaments keeping the bones fixed in the correct position can be damaged or loosened, making it easier for the joint to be dislocated in the future.

=== Risk factors ===
A variety of risk factors can predispose individuals to joint dislocation. They can vary depending on location of the joint. Genetic factors and underlying medical conditions can further increase risk. Genetic conditions, such as hypermobility syndrome and Ehlers–Danlos syndrome put individuals at increased risk for dislocations. Hypermobility syndrome is an inherited disorder that affects the ligaments around joints. The loosened or stretched ligaments in the joint provide less stability and allow for the joint to dislocate more easily. Dislocation can also occur because of conditions such as rheumatoid arthritis. In Rheumatoid arthritis the production of synovial fluid decreases, gradually causing pain, swollen joints, and stiffness. A forceful push causes friction and can dislocate the joint. Notably, joint instability in the neck is a potential complication of rheumatoid arthritis.

Participation in sports, being male, variations in the shape of the joint, being older, and joint hypermobility in males are risk factors associated with an increased risk of first time dislocation. Risk factors for recurrent dislocation include participation in sports, being a young male, a history of a previous dislocation with an associated injury, and any history of previous dislocation.

== Diagnosis ==
Initial evaluation of a suspected joint dislocation begins with a thorough patient history, including mechanism of injury, and physical examination. Special attention should be focused on the neurovascular exam both before and after reduction, as injury to these structures may occur during the injury or during the reduction process. Imaging studies are frequently obtained to assist with diagnosis and to determine the extent of injury.

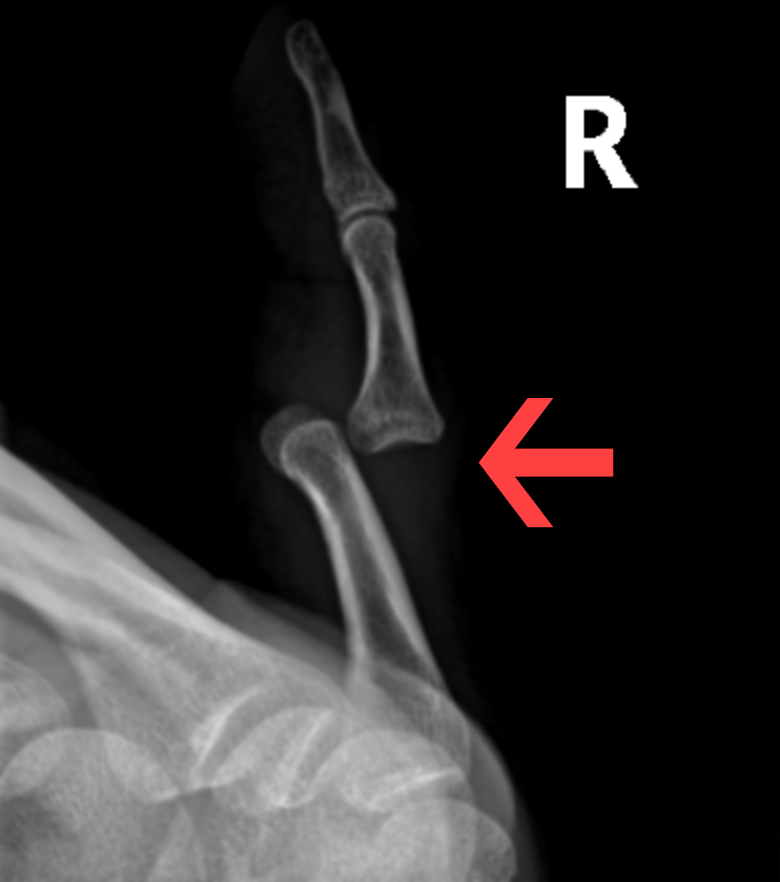
Radiograph of right fifth finger dislocation

=== Imaging Types ===
==== X-ray, usually a minimum of 2-views ====
- Generally, pre- and post-reduction X-rays are taken. Initial X-ray can confirm the dislocation and evaluate for any fractures. Post-reduction x-rays confirm successful joint alignment and can identify any injuries that may have been caused during the reduction procedure.
- If initial X-rays are normal but additional injury is suspected, there may be a benefit of obtaining stress/weight-bearing views to look for injury to ligamentous structures and/or need for surgical intervention. One example is with AC joint separations.

==== Ultrasound ====
- Ultrasound may be useful in an acute setting, and is a bedside test that can be performed in the Emergency Department. Ultrasound accuracy is dependent on user ability and experience. Ultrasound is nearly as effective as x-ray in detecting shoulder dislocations. Ultrasound may also have utility in diagnosing AC joint dislocations.
- In infants <6 months of age with suspected developmental dysplasia of the hip (congenital hip dislocation), ultrasound is the imaging study of choice. This is due to the lack of ossification at this age, which will not be apparent on x-rays.

==== Cross-sectional imaging (CT or MRI) ====
- X-rays are generally sufficient in confirming a joint dislocation. However, additional imaging can be used to better define and evaluate abnormalities that may be missed or unclear on plain X-rays. CT and MRI are not routinely used for simple dislocation, however CT is useful in certain cases such as hip dislocation where an occult femoral neck fracture is suspected . CT angiogram may be used if vascular injury is suspected. In addition to improved visualization of bony abnormalities, MRI permits for a more detailed inspection of the joint-supporting structures in order to assess for ligamentous and other soft tissue injury.

=== Classification ===
Dislocations can either be full, referred to as luxation, or partial, referred to as subluxation. Simple dislocations are dislocations without an associated fracture, while complex dislocations have an associated fracture. Depending on the type of joint involved (i.e. ball-and-socket, hinge), the dislocation can further be classified by anatomical position, such as an anterior hip dislocation. Joint dislocations are named based on the distal component in relation to the proximal one.

== Prevention ==
Preventing joint dislocations can be difficult since most are caused by an unexpected injury. If participating in activities such as contact sports, where there is a risk for dislocation, wearing appropriate protective equipment can be helpful. Similarly, avoiding positions that place the joint in a vulnerable position can reduce the risk of experiencing a dislocation. Strengthening the muscles surrounding joints can effectively reduce the risk of a joint dislocation and recurrent dislocations.

== Treatment ==
=== Non-operative ===
==== Reduction/Repositioning ====
X-rays are taken to confirm the diagnosis and detect any associated fractures. A dislocation is easily seen on an X-ray. Once X-rays are taken, the joint is usually manipulated back into position. This can be a very painful process. This is typically done either in the emergency department under sedation or in an operating room under a general anaesthetic. A dislocated joint should be reduced into its normal position only by a trained medical professional. Trying to reduce a joint without any training could worsen the injury.

It is important to reduce the joint as soon as possible. Delaying reduction can compromise the blood supply to the joint. This is especially true in the case of a dislocated ankle, due to the anatomy of the blood supply to the foot. On field reduction is crucial for joint dislocations. As they are extremely common in sports events, managing them correctly at the game at the time of injury, can reduce long term issues. They require prompt evaluation, diagnosis, reduction, and post-reduction management before the person can be evaluated at a medical facility. After a dislocation, injured joints are usually held in place by a splint (for straight joints like fingers and toes) or a bandage (for complex joints like shoulders).

==== Immobilization ====
Immobilization is a method of treatment to place the injured joint in a sling or in another immobilizing device in order to keep the joint stable. There is no significant difference in healing or long-term joint mobility between simple shoulder dislocations treated conservatively versus surgically. Shorter immobilization periods are encouraged, with the goal of return to increased range-of-motion activities as soon as possible. Shorter immobilization periods is linked to increased ranges of motion in some joints.

==== Rehabilitation ====
Muscles, tendons and ligaments around the joint should be strengthened. This is usually done through a course of physical therapy, which will also help reduce the chances of repeated dislocations of the same joint. Take the shoulder for example. The most common treatment method for a dislocation of the shoulder joint is exercise based management. For shoulder instability, the therapeutic program depends on specific characteristics of the instability pattern, severity, recurrence and direction with adaptations made based on the needs of the patient. In general, the therapeutic program should focus on restoration of strength, normalization of range of motion and optimization of flexibility and muscular performance. Throughout all stages of the rehabilitation program, it is important to take all related joints and structures into consideration.

=== Operative ===
Surgery is often considered in extensive injuries or after failure of conservative management with strengthening exercises. The need for surgery will depend on the location of the dislocation and the extent of the injury. Different methods and techniques exist to stabilize the joint with surgery. One method is through the use of arthroscopic surgery.

== Prognosis ==
Prognosis varies depending on the location and extent of the dislocation. The prognosis of a shoulder dislocation is dependent on various factors including age, strength, connective tissue health and severity of the injury causing the dislocation. There is a good prognosis in simple elbow dislocations in younger people. Older people report more pain and stiffness on average. Wrist dislocations are often difficult to manage due to the difficulty in healing the small bones in the wrist. Finger displacement towards the back of the hand is often irreducible due to associated injuries, while finger displacement towards the palm of the hand is more readily reducible. Overall, recovering from a joint dislocation can range from a few weeks to months, depending on the severity of the injury.

== Epidemiology ==
Each joint in the body can be dislocated, however, there are common sites where most dislocations occur. The most common dislocated parts of the body are discussed as follows:

- Dislocated shoulder
  - Anterior shoulder dislocation is the most common type of shoulder dislocation, accounting for at least 90% of shoulder dislocations. Anterior shoulder dislocations have a recurrence rate around 39%, with younger age at initial dislocation, male sex, and joint hyperlaxity being risk factors for increased recurrence.
  - The incidence rate of anterior shoulder dislocations is roughly 23.1 to 23.9 per 100,000 person-years. Young males have a higher incidence rate, roughly four times that of the overall population.
  - Recurrent anterior shoulder dislocations have a higher rate of labrum tears (Bankart lesion) and humerus fractures/dents (Hill-Sachs lesion) compared to initial dislocations.
  - Shoulder dislocations account for 45% of all dislocation visits to the emergency room.
- Elbow
  - The incidence rate of elbow dislocations is 5 to 6 per 100,000 persons per year.
  - Posterior dislocations are the most common type of elbow dislocations, comprising 90% of all elbow dislocations.
- Wrist
  - Overall, injuries to the small bones and ligaments in the wrist are uncommon.
  - Lunate dislocations are the most common.
- Finger
  - Interphalangeal (IP) or metacarpophalangeal (MCP) joint dislocations
    - In the United States, men are most likely to sustain a finger dislocation with an incidence rate of 17.8 per 100,000 person-years. Women have an incidence rate of 4.65 per 100,000 person-years. The average age group that sustain a finger dislocation are between 15 and 19 years old.
    - The most common dislocations are in the proximal interphalangeal (PIP) joints.
- Hip
  - Posterior and anterior hip dislocation
    - Anterior dislocations are less common than posterior dislocations. 10% of all dislocations are anterior and this is broken down into superior and inferior types. Superior dislocations account for 10% of all anterior dislocations, and inferior dislocations account for 90%. 16–40 year old males are more likely to receive dislocations due to a car accident.
    - When an individual receives a hip dislocation, there is an incidence rate of 95% that they will receive an injury to another part of their body as well.
    - 46–84% of hip dislocations occur secondary to traffic accidents, the remaining percentage is due based on falls, industrial accidents or sporting injury.
- Knee
  - The majority of knee dislocations (64.5%) are caused by trauma to the knee, with more than half caused by car and motorcycle accidents.
  - The incidence rate of initial patellar dislocations is roughly 32.8 per 100,000 person years.
  - Nearly 41% of knee dislocations have an associated fracture, with the majority of these fractures in one of the legs.
  - Nerve injury occurs in about 15.3% of knee dislocations, while major artery injury occurs in 7.8% of knee dislocations.
  - More than half (53.5%) of knee dislocations have an associated torn meniscus.
  - Quadriceps tendon rupture occurs up to 13.1% of the time, and patellar tendon rupture occurs 6.8% of the time.
- Foot and Ankle
  - A lisfranc injury is a dislocation or fracture-dislocation injury at the tarsometatarsal joints.
  - A subtalar dislocation, or talocalcaneonavicular dislocation, is a simultaneous dislocation of the talar joints at the talocalcaneal and talonavicular levels.
  - Subtalar dislocations without associated fractures represent about 1% of all traumatic injuries of the foot. They represent 1–2% of all dislocations and are caused by high energy trauma.
  - A total talar dislocation has high rates of complications but is rare.
  - Ankle sprains primarily occur as a result of tearing the ATFL (anterior talofibular ligament) in the talocrural joint. The ATFL tears most easily when the foot is in plantarflexion and inversion. Weakening of the ligaments can put the ankle at risk for dislocation.
  - An ankle dislocation without fracture is rare, due to the strength of ligaments surrounding the ankle.

== Gallery ==
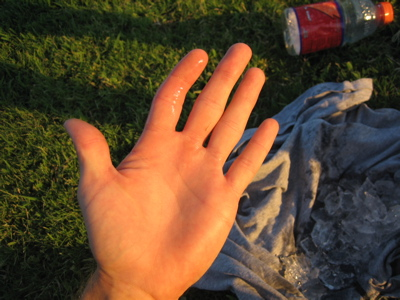
Dislocation of the left index finger

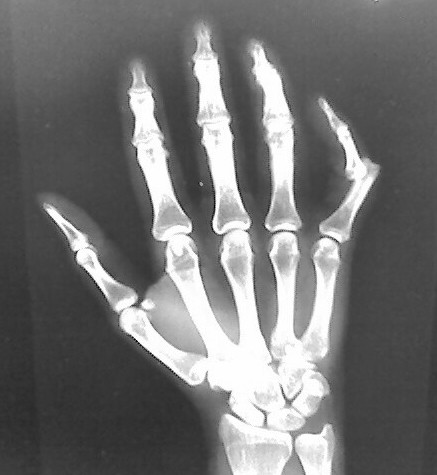
Radiograph of right fifth phalanx bone dislocation

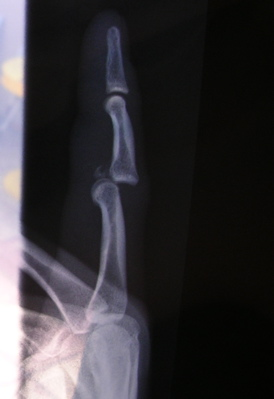
Radiograph of left index finger dislocation

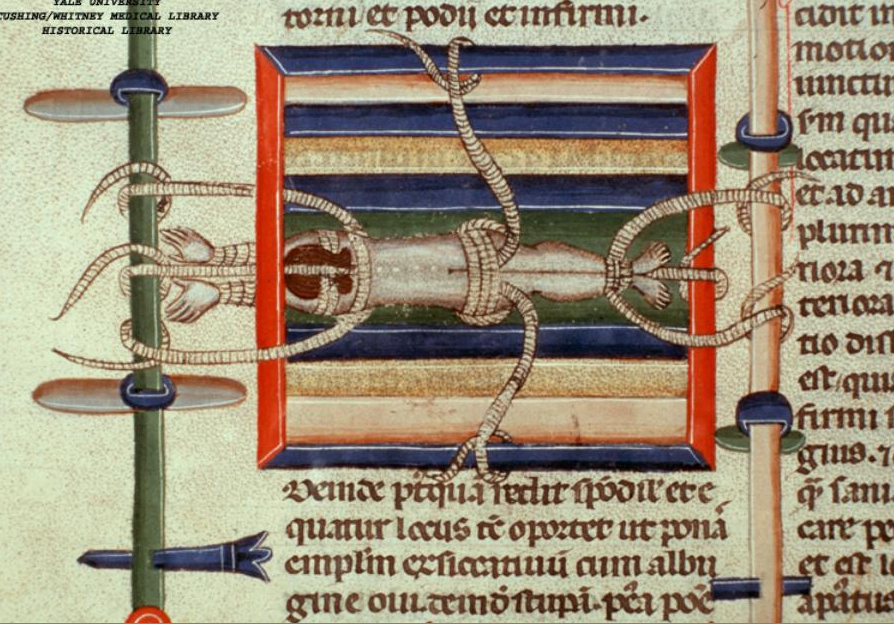
Depiction of reduction of a dislocated spine, c. 1300

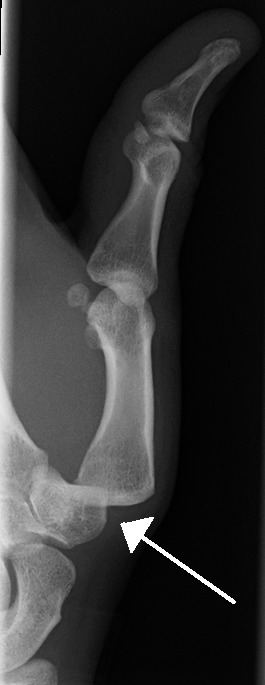
Dislocation of the carpo-metacarpal joint.

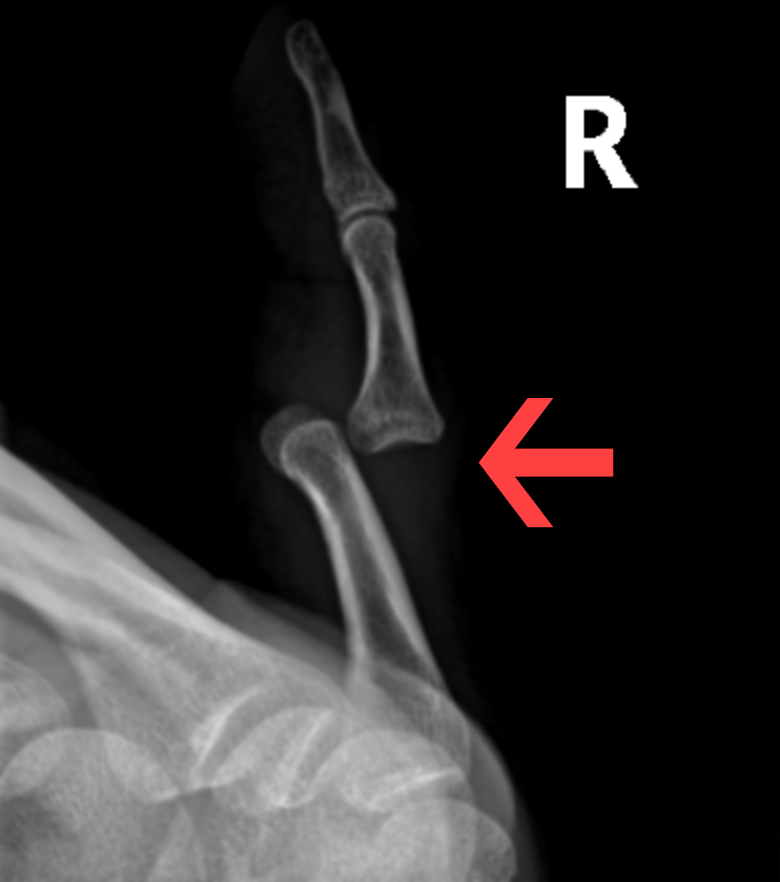
Radiograph of right fifth phalanx dislocation resulting from bicycle accident

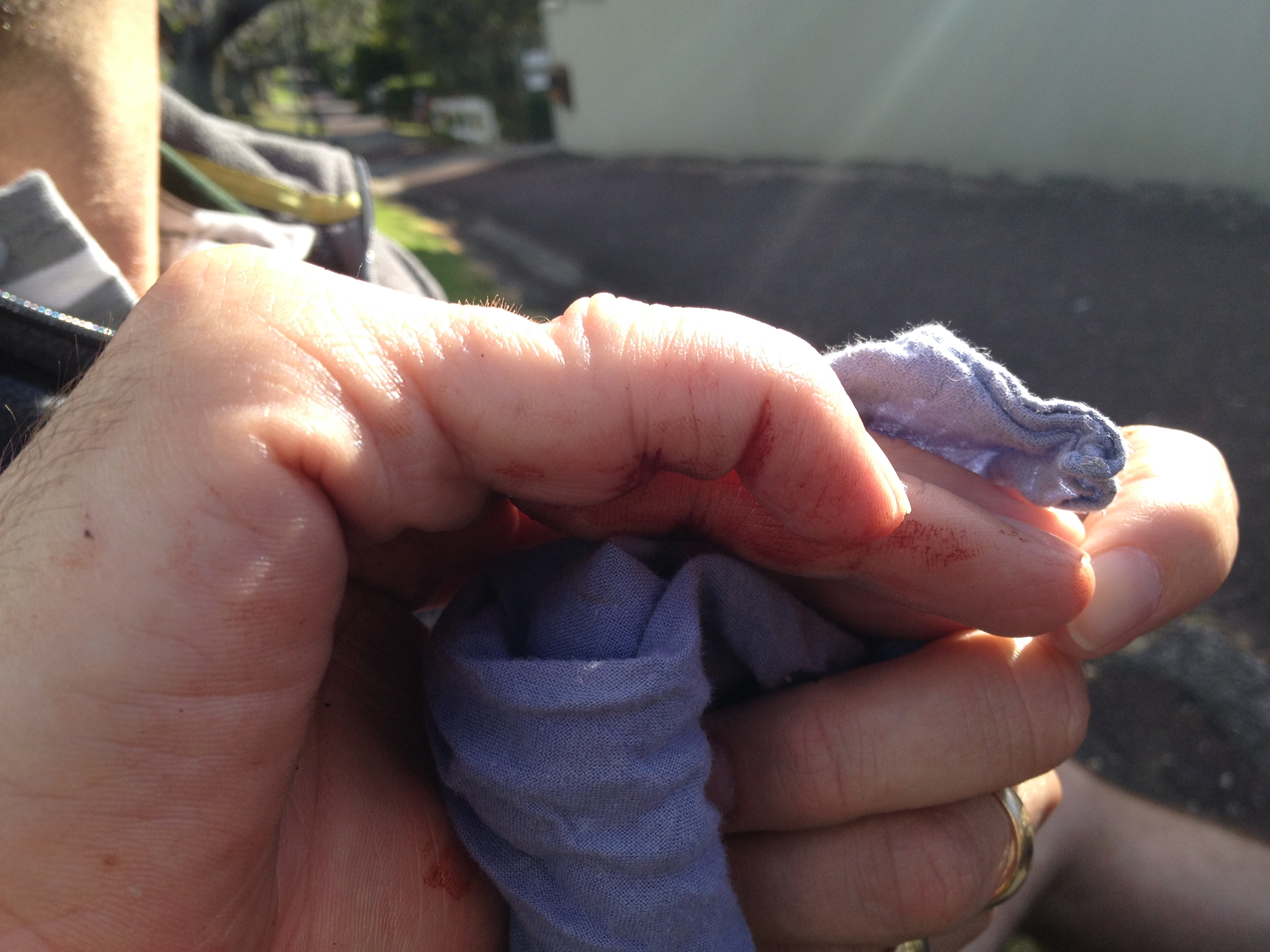
Right fifth phalanx dislocation resulting from bicycle accident

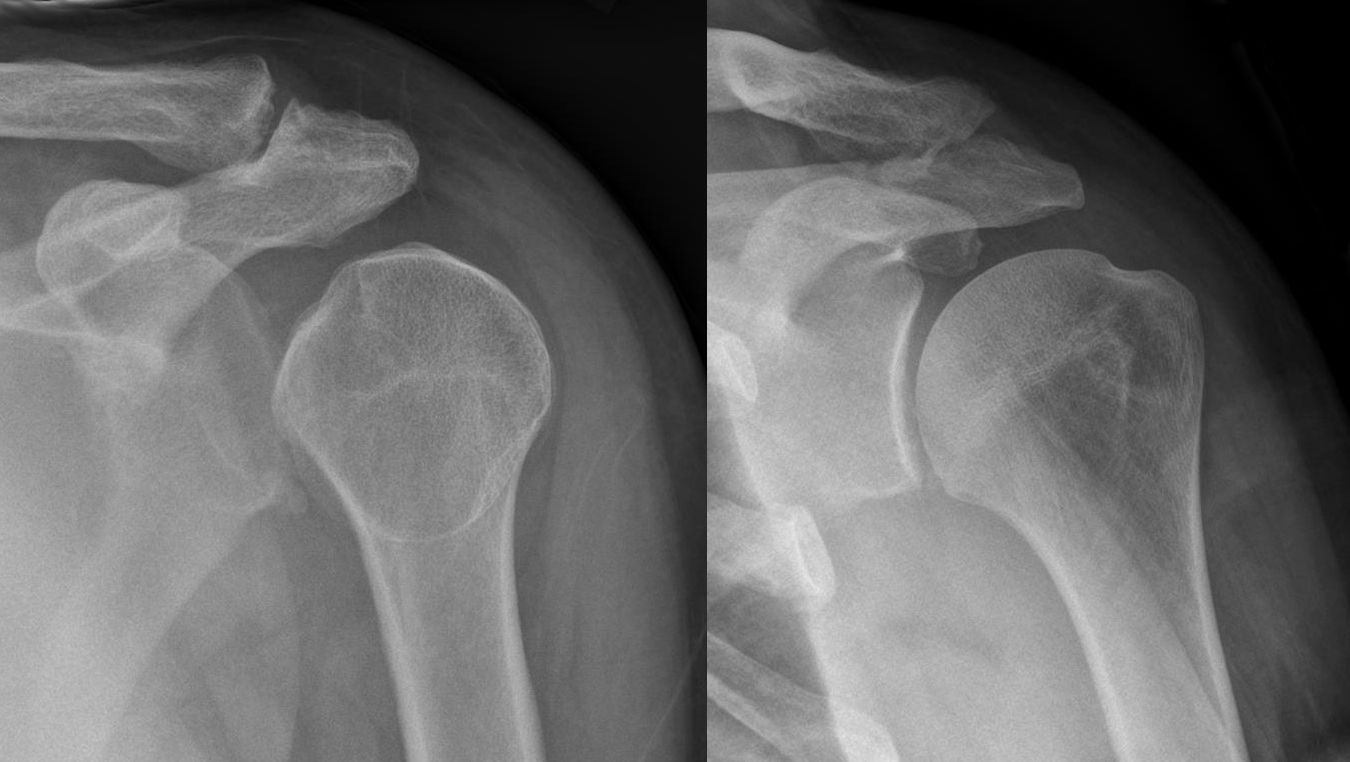
Shoulder dislocation before (left) and after (right) being reduced

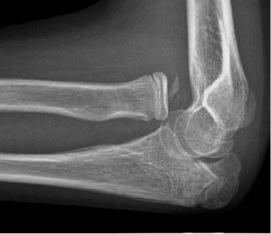
X-ray of ventral dislocation of the radial head. There is calcification of annular ligament, which can be seen as early as 2 weeks after injury.

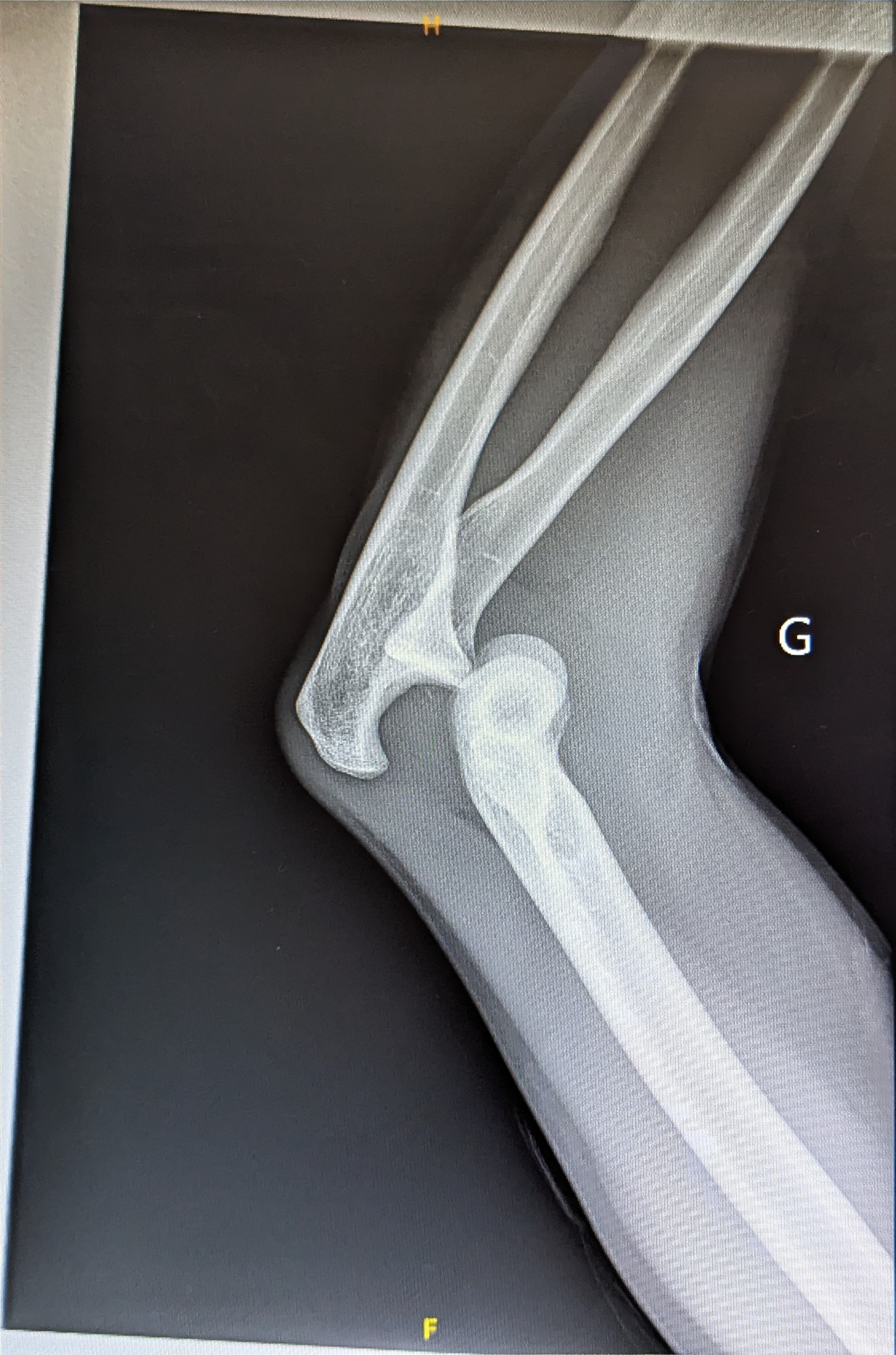
X-ray of left elbow posterior joint dislocation without fracture

== See also ==
- Buddy wrapping
- Major trauma
- Physical therapy
- Projectional radiography
- Listhesis, olisthesis, or olisthy
