= Torus fracture =

Common type of fracture in children

A Torus fracture, also known as a buckle fracture, is the most common fracture in children. It is a common occurrence following a fall, as the wrist absorbs most of the impact and compresses the bony cortex on one side and remains intact on the other, creating a bulging effect. As the bulge is only on one side of the bone, this injury can be classified as an incomplete fracture. The compressive force is provided by the trabeculae and is longitudinal to the axis of the long bone, meaning that the fracture itself is orthogonal to that axis. The word "torus" originates from the Latin word "protuberance."

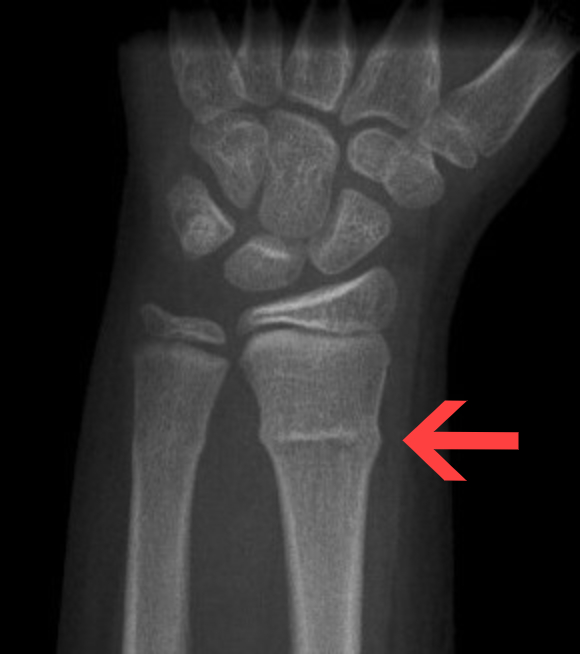
A radiograph image of a torus (buckle) fracture

Simplified diagram of a buckle fracture

== Signs and symptoms ==
Torus fractures are low risk and may cause acute pain. As the bone buckles (or crushes), instead of breaking, they are a stable injury as there is no displacement of the bone. This mechanism is analogous to the crumple zones in cars. As with other fractures, the site of fracture may be tender to touch and cause a sharp pain if pressure is exerted on the injured area.

== Risk factors ==
Physical activities or sports such as bike riding or climbing increase the associated risk for buckle fractures in the potential event of a collision or fall. As aforementioned, the most common buckle fracture is of the distal radius in the forearm, which typically originates from a Fall Onto an Outstretched Hand (FOOSH). Such orthopaedic injuries are distinctive in children as their bones are softer and in a dynamic state of bone growth and development, with a higher collagen to bone ratio so incomplete fractures such as the buckle fracture are a more common occurrence.

== Diagnosis ==
Buckle fractures can be identified by performing a radiograph. The diagnosis of a torus fracture is made from both anterior/posterior and lateral projections. The typical features include:

- The buckling of cortical bone, which may appear as a small bulge or protuberance in the radius or ulna.
- The bone may have a slight angulation.

== Treatment ==
There is no established 'standard' treatment for buckle fractures. However, in 2022 the largest and highest quality treatment study was published about this injury in the Lancet medical journal - called the FORCE Study (see infographic in images). The study was conducted throughout the UK in 21 emergency departments. This study fairly allocated children (through randomisation) to either splint and routine follow-up, or a bandage and no follow-up. 965 children were in this study, which showed equivalent results for pain scores, function and complications between the treatments. This offered clinicians, parents and young people reassurance that this fracture will heal well, without complications and immobilisation and follow-up is almost always not needed.

Furthermore, a national guideline from the UK's National Institute for Health and Care Excellence (NICE), which was published before that study, identified that all treatments appeared safe, without the need for a follow-up.

Other studies have also shown that parental satisfaction of nearly 100% is achieved when using removable splints that can be taken off at home without the need for outpatient clinics, .

The FORCE Study Results Summary
