= Reduction (orthopedic procedure) =

Fracture and dislocation fixing

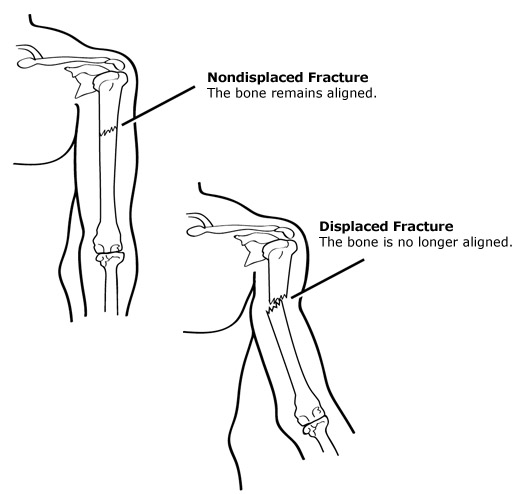
Fracture displacement

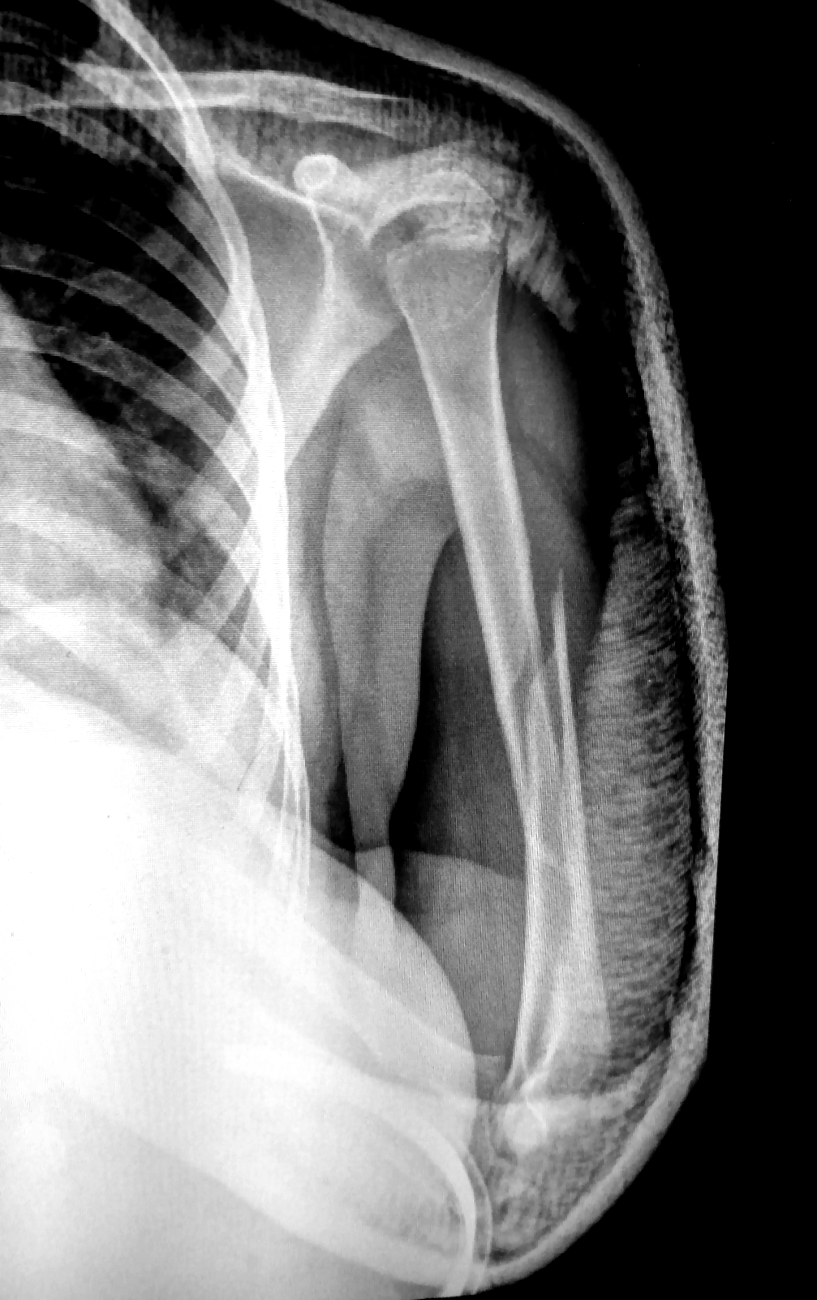
Displaced humerus fracture

Reduction is a medical procedure to restore the correct anatomical alignment of a fracture or dislocation. When an injury results in a fracture, or broken bone, the bone segments can sometimes become misaligned. This is referred to as a displaced fracture, which requires the medical procedure called reduction. Some providers may refer to this as 'setting the bone'. When an injury results in a dislocation of a joint, or the misalignment of two connecting bones, a similar process of reduction must be performed to relocate the joint back into normal anatomical positioning. In the case of both displaced fractures and joint dislocation reduction is required for effective healing.

== Fracture reduction ==
There are two main categories of fracture reductions: closed reductions and open reductions. Both procedures require confirmatory imaging – such as X-ray – both before the reduction to confirm the misalignment of bones and after the reduction procedure to confirm successful achievement of anatomical positioning.

=== Closed reduction ===
Closed reduction is when bone alignment is achieved from external manipulation of the bone without having to open the skin. This is not a surgical procedure and is often performed in the emergency department with local anesthetic for pain management. A distal radial fracture (wrist) is a common injury that requires a closed reduction.

=== Open reduction ===
Open reduction is a surgical procedure in which bone alignment is achieved from internal manipulation of the bone when the skin is open. After reduction of the fractured site, it is common that fixed hardware is put in place to maintain anatomical alignment during bone healing; this process is called fixation. While many open reductions require either internal (ORIF) or external fixation (OREF) there are some fractures that, after open reduction, do not require fixation.

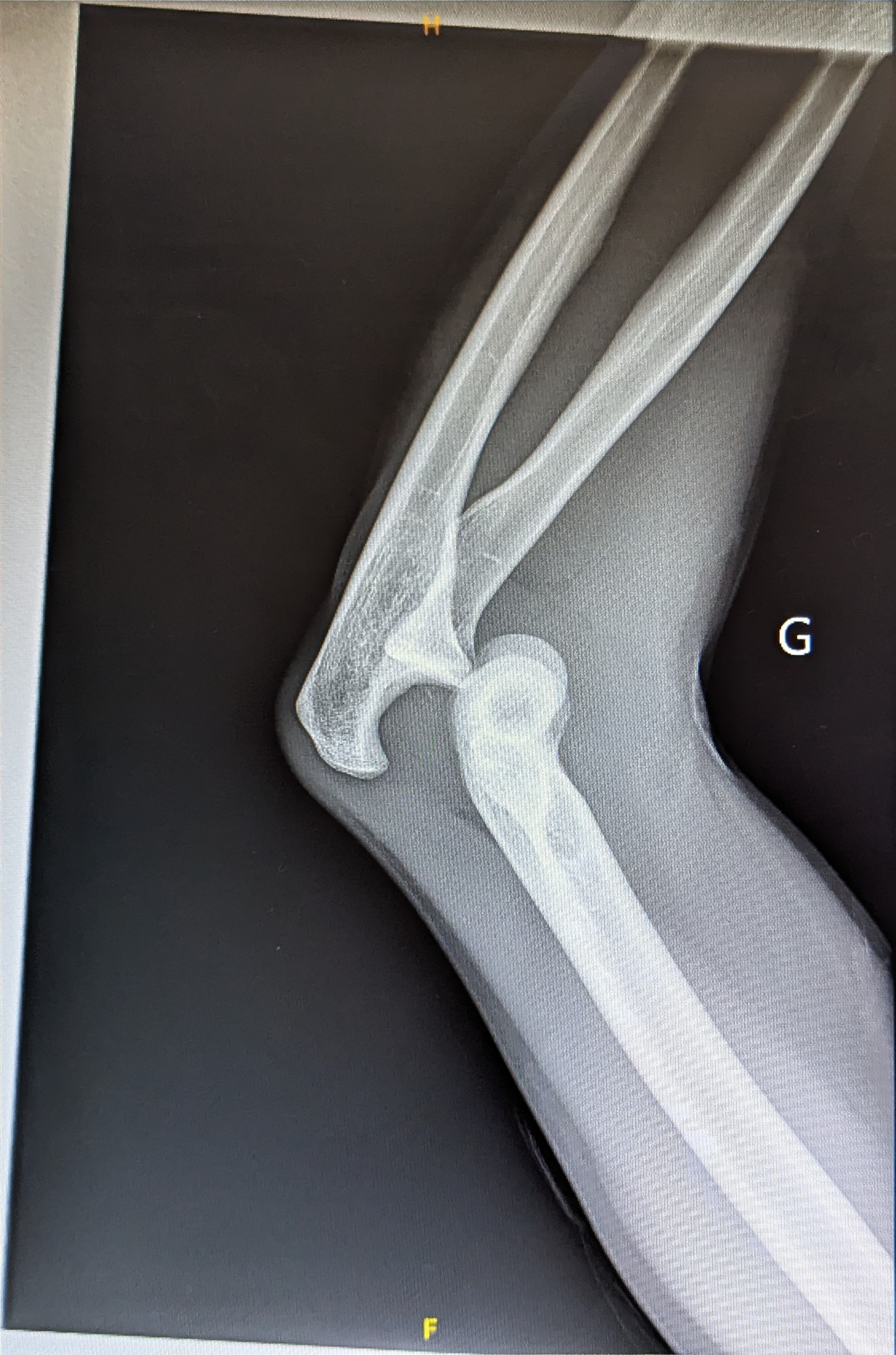
Joint dislocation

== Dislocation reduction ==
Reductions for dislocations are dependent on the joint they involve. Common dislocations include the shoulder, finger, hip, knee and patella. In children, the elbow is also a common dislocation and referred to as nursemaid's elbow. There are many techniques but the same tenets are generally applied to all dislocation reductions. Traction, or sustained pulling pressure, is applied to the distal bone of the dislocated joint to relax the surrounding musculature and create space for the bone to move back into anatomical position. Traction can be applied either by human strength or with a system of pulleys and weights. Surrounding muscles, nerves and vasculature can be disrupted during the initial injury which can result in further surgical requirements even if proper bone alignment is achieved.

== Procedural medications ==
Open reductions are typically done under general anesthesia administered by anesthesiologists in the operating room. Closed reductions are most often done with the aid of multimodal pain medications, sedatives and/or local anesthesia. Commonly a state of moderate sedation, or conscious sedation, is desired to reduce patient stress from the experience and relax the patient to improve in the manipulation during reduction. Ketamine and Midazolam are common choices for pediatric conscious sedations and are often given in conjunction with a short acting opiate like fentanyl. In adults, propofol, midazolam and etomidate are frequently used for conscious sedation with a short acting opiate like fentanyl. Local hematoma blocks are also commonly employed for the reduction of forearm fractures. Hematoma blocks are when a local anesthetic like lidocaine is injected into the fracture site under the guidance of ultrasound to allow for fracture manipulation and reduction without pain or the need for systemic medications. NSAIDs and acetaminophen continue to be mainstays of pain management due to their efficacy and safety.

== Procedural risks and complications ==
Risks and complications from reductions include but are not limited to further damage to the fracture or dislocation, and damage to surrounding structures and tissues such as nerves, muscles, and blood vessels. There is also a risk of an unsuccessful reduction, which might require multiple attempts and prolonged need for medication administration or switching to a surgical intervention, in the case of dislocations and closed fractures. The medications administered during the procedure such as medications to block pain (local or general anesthetic) also have side effect profiles and risks of administration. Open reductions carry the risks of any orthopedic surgery, including but not limited to infection, hardware failures, damage to surrounding structures, and adverse reactions to general anesthesia.

== Recovery and rehabilitation ==
After a closed reduction, pain is expected for 2–3 weeks and potentially milder pain for up to 12 weeks.
