= Frykman classification =

Colles' fracture classification system

Frykman classification is a system of categorizing Colles' fractures. In the Frykman classification system there are four types of fractures.

== Classification ==
Though the Frykman classification system has traditionally been used, there is little value in its use because it does not help direct treatment. The classification is as follows:

Radius Fracture	Ulna Fracture	
Radius Fracture	Absent	Present
Extra articular	I	II
Intra-articular involving radiocarpal joint	III	IV
Intra articular involving distal radio-ulnar joint	V	VI
Intra articular involving both radiocarpal & distal radioulnar joints	VII	VIII

== See also ==
- Gartland & Werley classification
- Lidström classification
- Nissen-Lie classification
- Older's classification
