= Hematoma block =

Medical technique

A hematoma block is an analgesic technique used to allow painless manipulation of fractures while avoiding the need for full anesthesia.

When a bone is fractured as a result of an injury, the two fragments may be displaced relative to each other. If they are not, usually no treatment is required other than immobilisation in an appropriate cast. If displacement does occur, then the space separating the fragments fills with blood shed by the damaged blood vessels within the bone. This collection, or pool, of blood is known as a hematoma. Injection of a suitable local anesthetic by needle and syringe through the skin into this hematoma produces relief of the pain caused by the fracture, allowing the bones to be painlessly manipulated.

== Complications ==
Hematoma blocks have a low risk of complications.
