= Wound =

Disruption or damage to living tissue

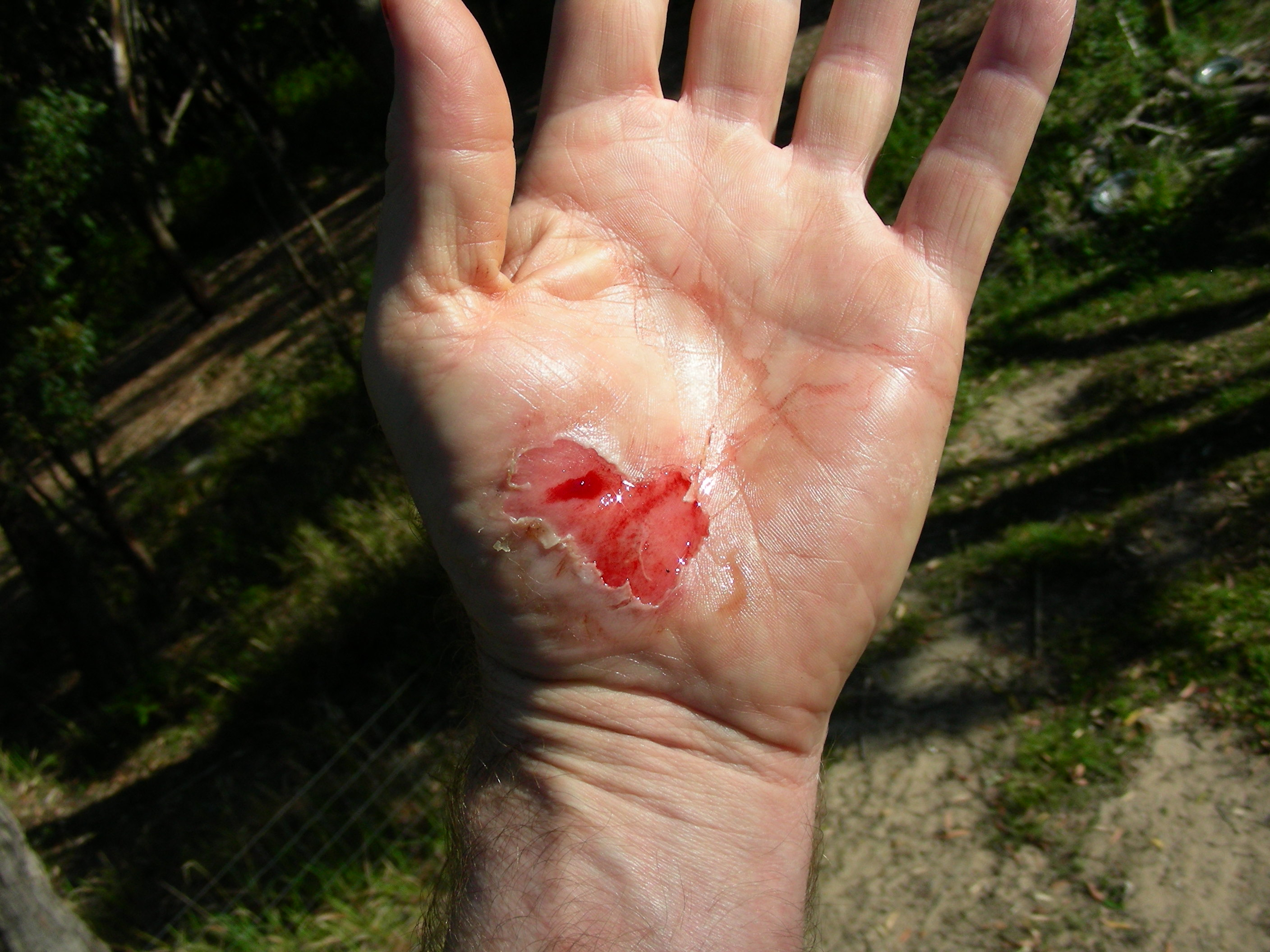
- Hand abrasion resulting from a bicycle accident
- Specialty: Emergency medicine; Plastic surgery

A wound is any disruption of or damage to living tissue, such as skin, mucous membranes, or organs. Wounds can either be the sudden result of direct trauma (mechanical, thermal, chemical), or can develop slowly over time due to underlying disease processes such as diabetes mellitus, venous/arterial insufficiency, or immunologic disease. Wounds can vary greatly in their appearance depending on wound location, injury mechanism, depth of injury, timing of onset (acute vs chronic), and wound sterility, among other factors. Treatment strategies for wounds will vary based on the classification of the wound, therefore it is essential that wounds be thoroughly evaluated by a healthcare professional for proper management. In normal physiology, all wounds will undergo a series of steps collectively known as the wound healing process, which include hemostasis, inflammation, proliferation, and tissue remodeling. Age, tissue oxygenation, stress, underlying medical conditions, and certain medications are just a few of the many factors known to affect the rate of wound healing.

== Classification ==
Wounds can be broadly classified as either acute or chronic based on time from initial injury and progression through normal stages of wound healing. Both wound types can further be categorized by cause of injury, wound severity/depth, and sterility of the wound bed. Several classification systems have been developed to describe wounds and guide their management. Some notable classification systems include the CDC's Surgical Wound Classification, the International Red Cross Wound Classification, the Tscherne classification, the Gustilo-Anderson classification of open fractures, and the AO soft tissue grading system.

=== Acute wounds ===
An acute wound is any wound which results from direct trauma and progresses through the four stages of wound healing along an expected timeline. The first stage, hemostasis, lasts from minutes to hours after initial injury. This stage is followed by the inflammatory phase which typically lasts 1 to 3 days. Proliferation is the third stage of wound healing and lasts from a few days up to a month. The fourth and final phase of wound healing, remodeling/scar formation, typically lasts 12 months but can continue as long as 2 years after the initial injury. Acute wounds can further be classified as either open or closed. An open wound is any injury whereby the integrity of the skin has been disrupted and the underlying tissue is exposed. A closed wound, on the other hand, is any injury in which underlying tissue has been damaged but the overlying skin is still intact.

==== Open wounds ====
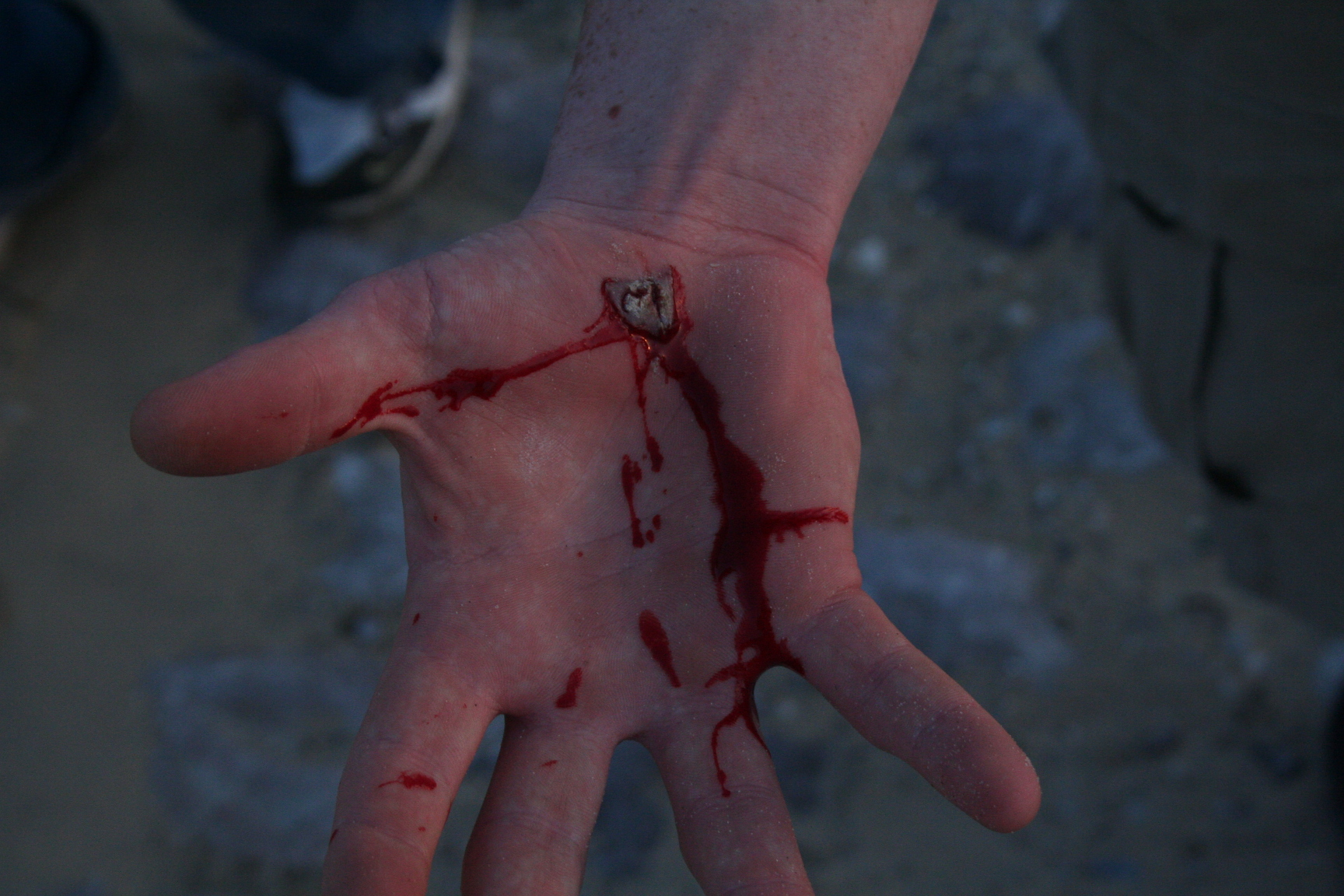
- Hand abrasion caused by a skateboard fall
  Incisions or incised wounds – caused by a clean, sharp-edged object such as a knife, razor, or glass splinter.
- Lacerations – irregular tear-like wounds caused by some blunt trauma. Lacerations and incisions may appear linear (regular) or stellate (irregular). The term laceration is commonly misused in reference to incisions.
- Abrasions (grazes) – superficial wounds in which the topmost layer of the skin (the epidermis) is scraped off. Abrasions are often caused by a sliding fall onto a rough surface such as asphalt, tree bark or concrete.
- Avulsions – injuries in which a body structure is forcibly detached from its normal point of insertion; a type of amputation where the extremity is pulled off rather than cut off. When used in reference to skin avulsions, the term 'degloving' is also sometimes used as a synonym.
- Puncture wounds – caused by an object puncturing the skin, such as a splinter, nail, knife or sharp tooth.
- Penetration wounds – caused by an object such as a knife entering and coming out from the skin.
- Gunshot wounds – caused by a bullet or similar projectile driving into or through the body. There may be two wounds, one at the site of entry and one at the site of exit, generally referred to as a "through-and-through."
- Critical wounds – Including large burns that have been split. These wounds can cause serious hydroelectrolytic and metabolic alterations including fluid loss, electrolyte imbalances, and increased catabolism.

==== Closed wounds ====
- Hematomas (or blood tumor) – caused by damage to a blood vessel that in turn causes blood to collect under the skin.
  - Hematomas that originate from internal blood vessel pathology are petechiae, purpura, and ecchymosis. The different classifications are based on size.
  - Hematomas that originate from an external source of trauma are contusions, also commonly called bruises.
- Crush injury – caused by a great or extreme amount of force applied over a long period of time.
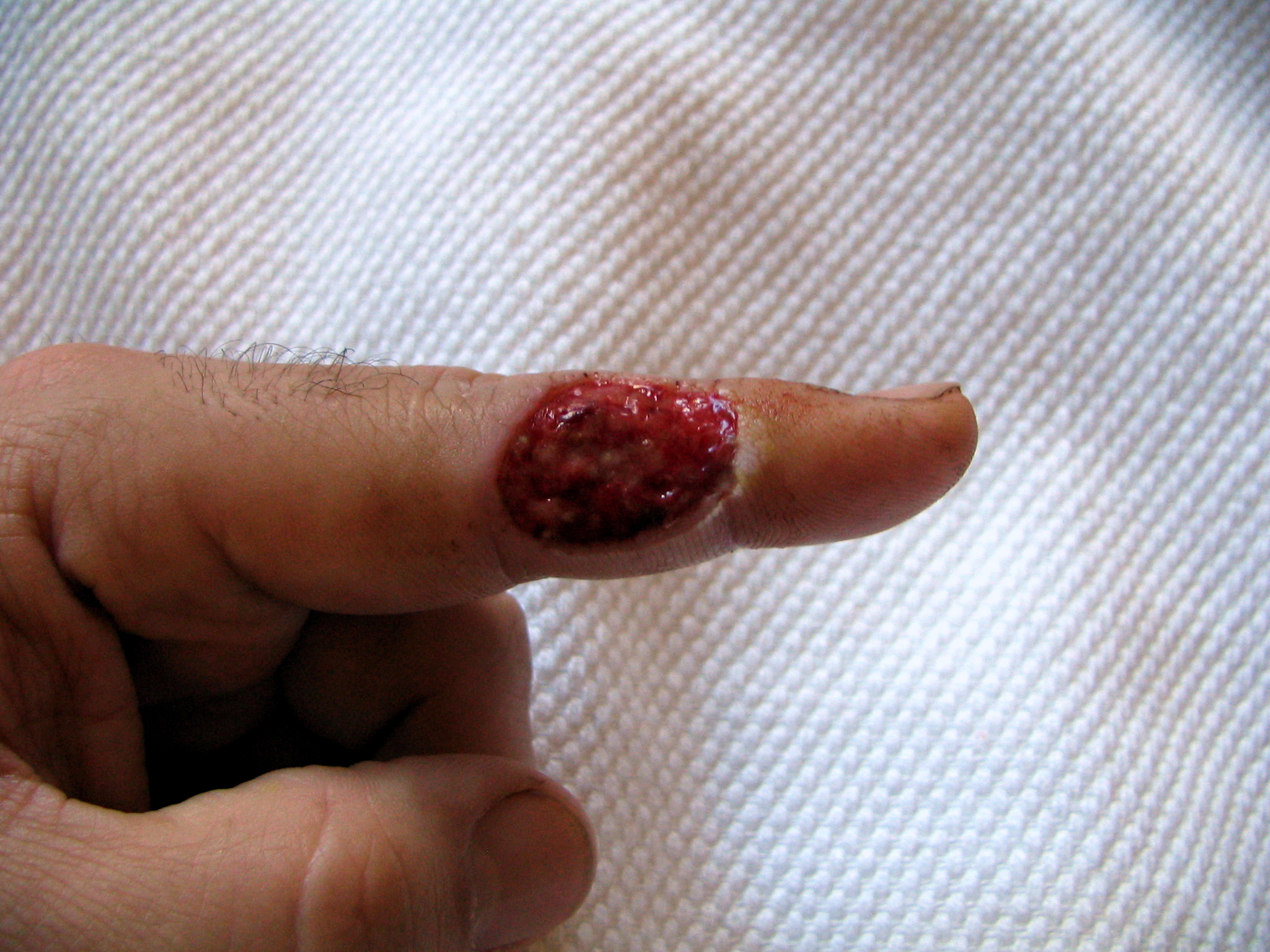
An open wound (an avulsion)

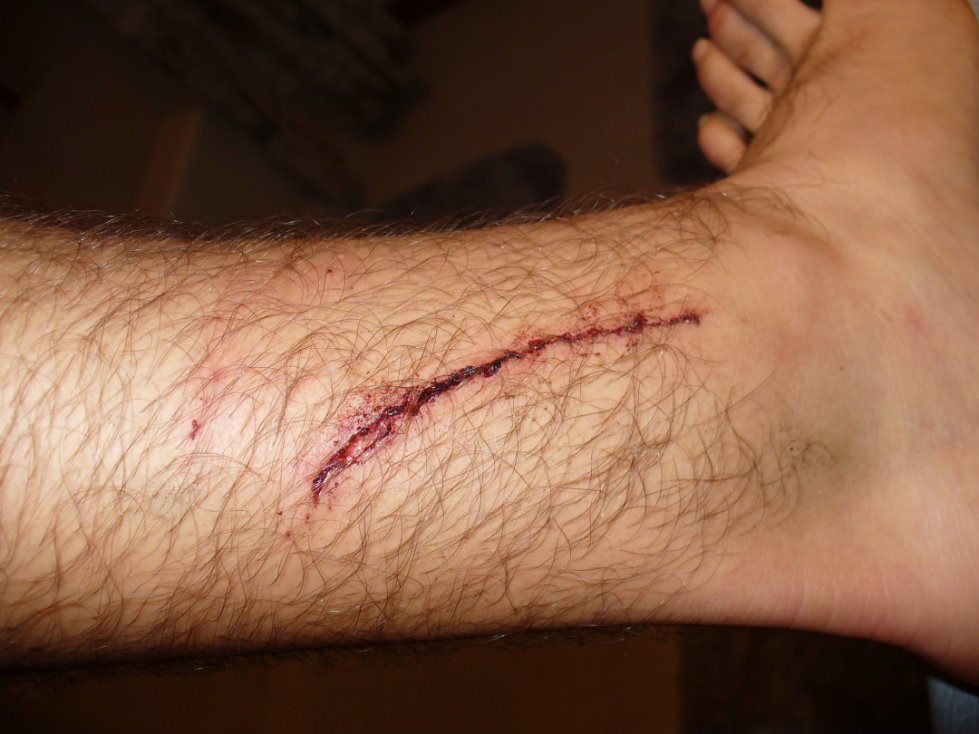
A laceration to the leg

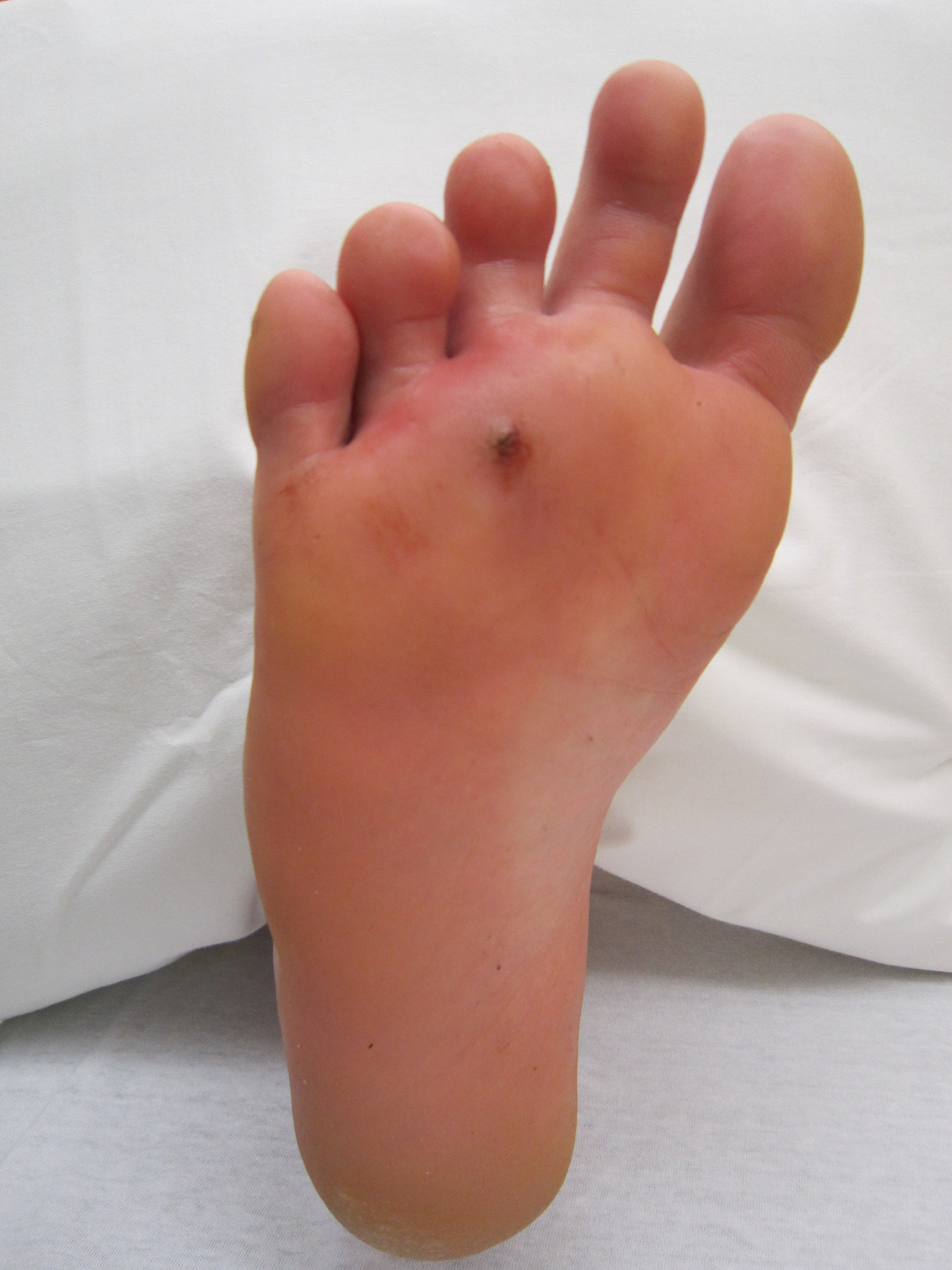
An infected puncture wound to the bottom of the forefoot

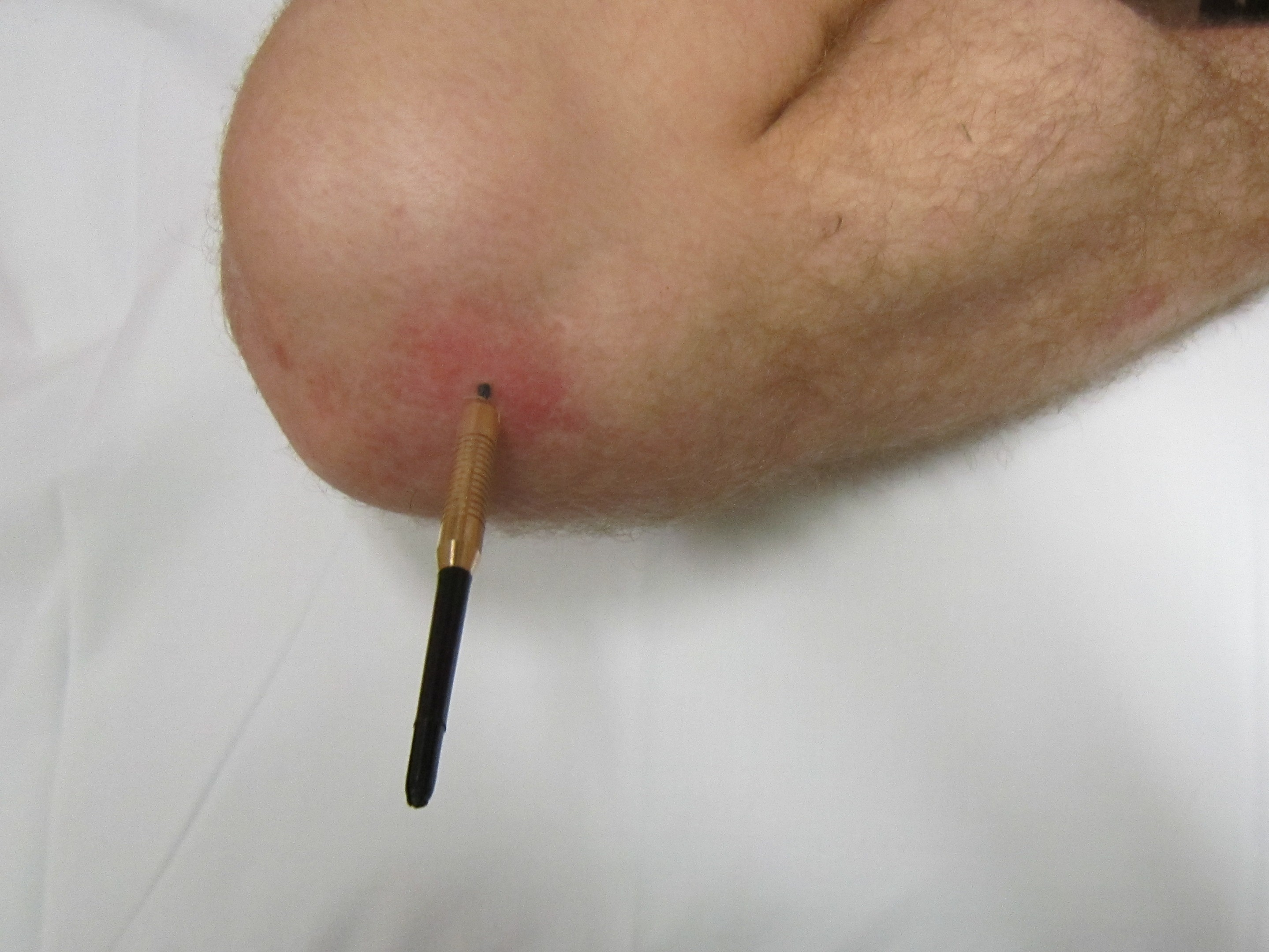
A puncture wound from playing darts

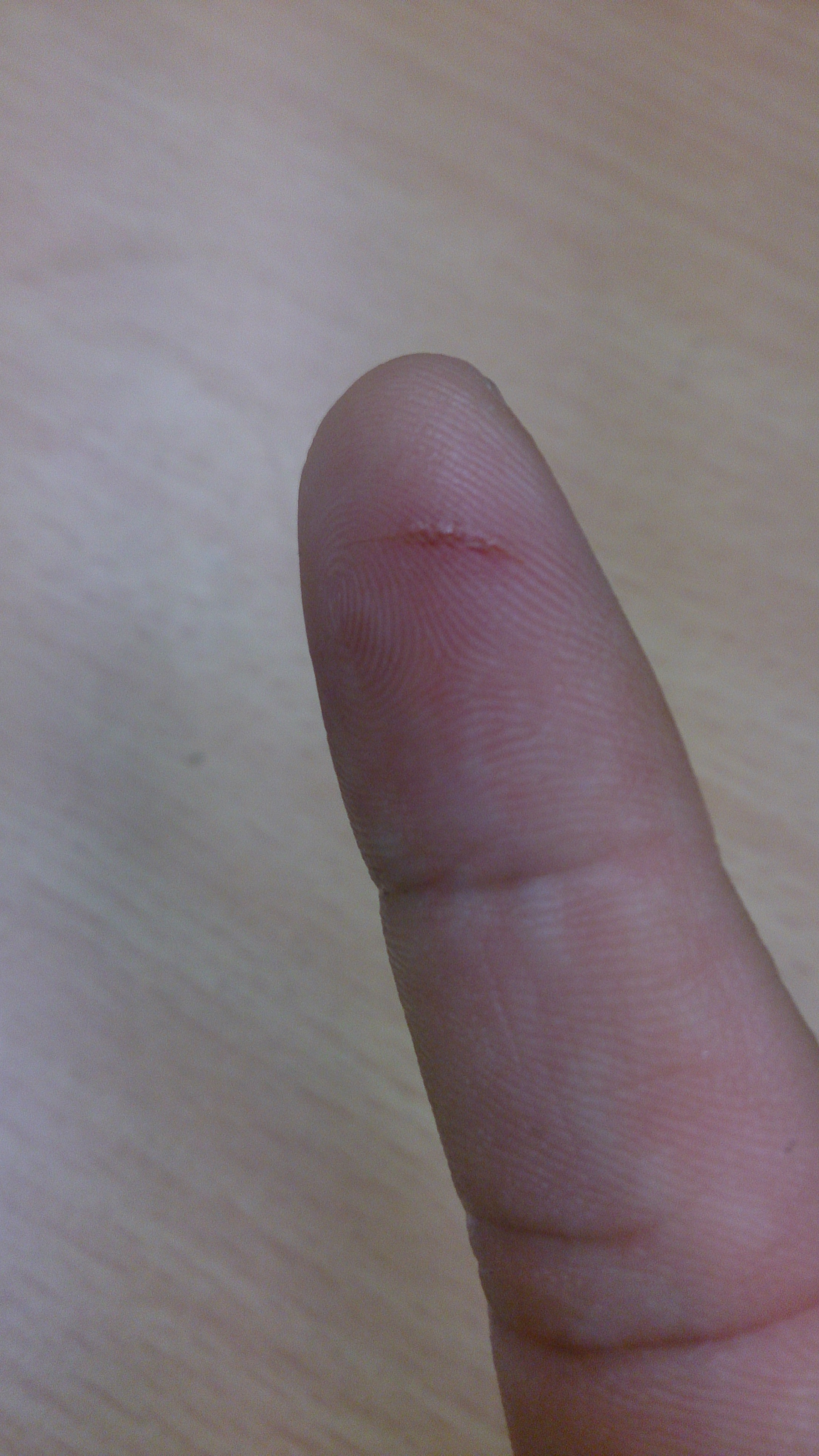
An incision: a small cut in a finger

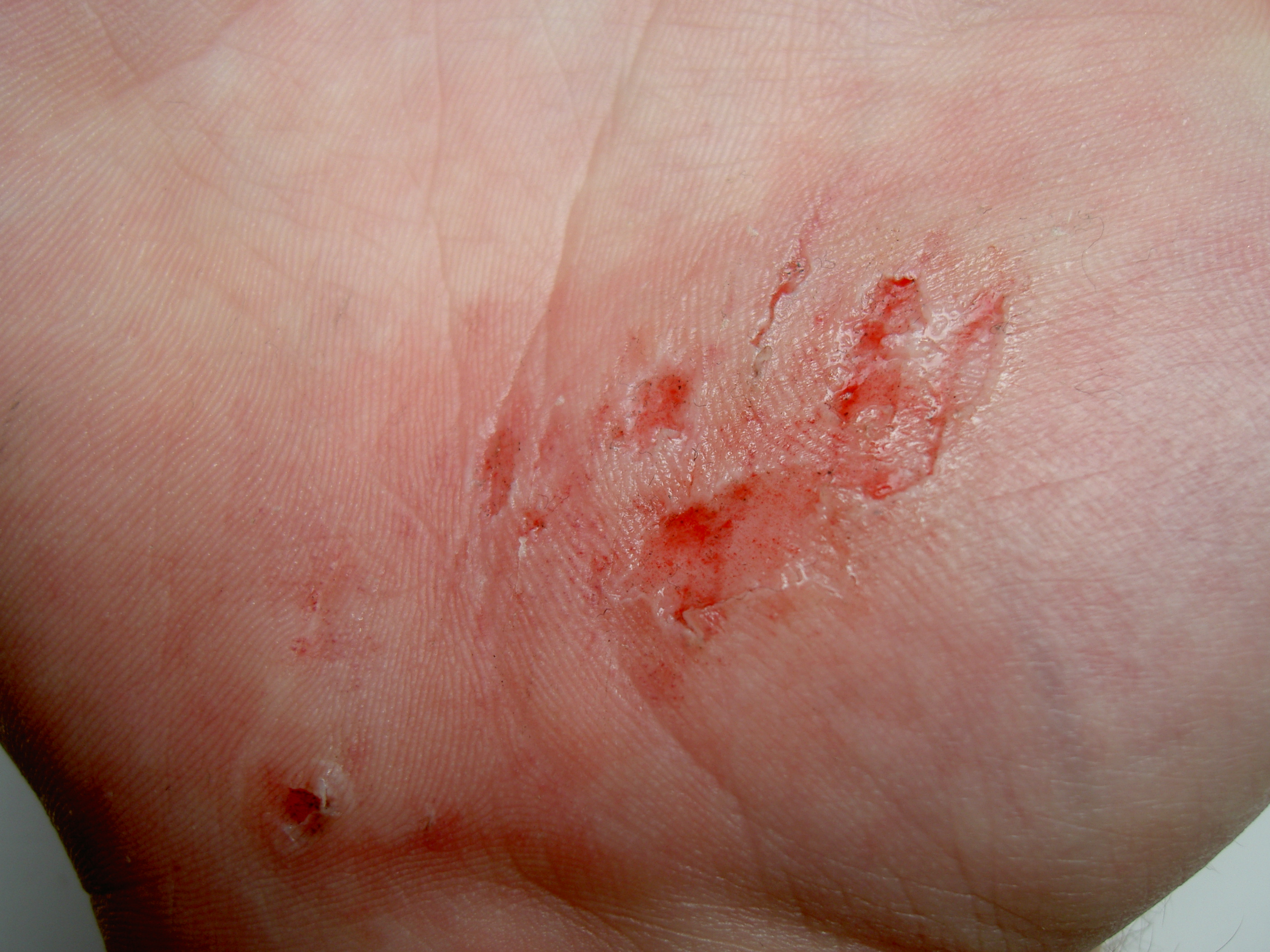
Abrasion on hand

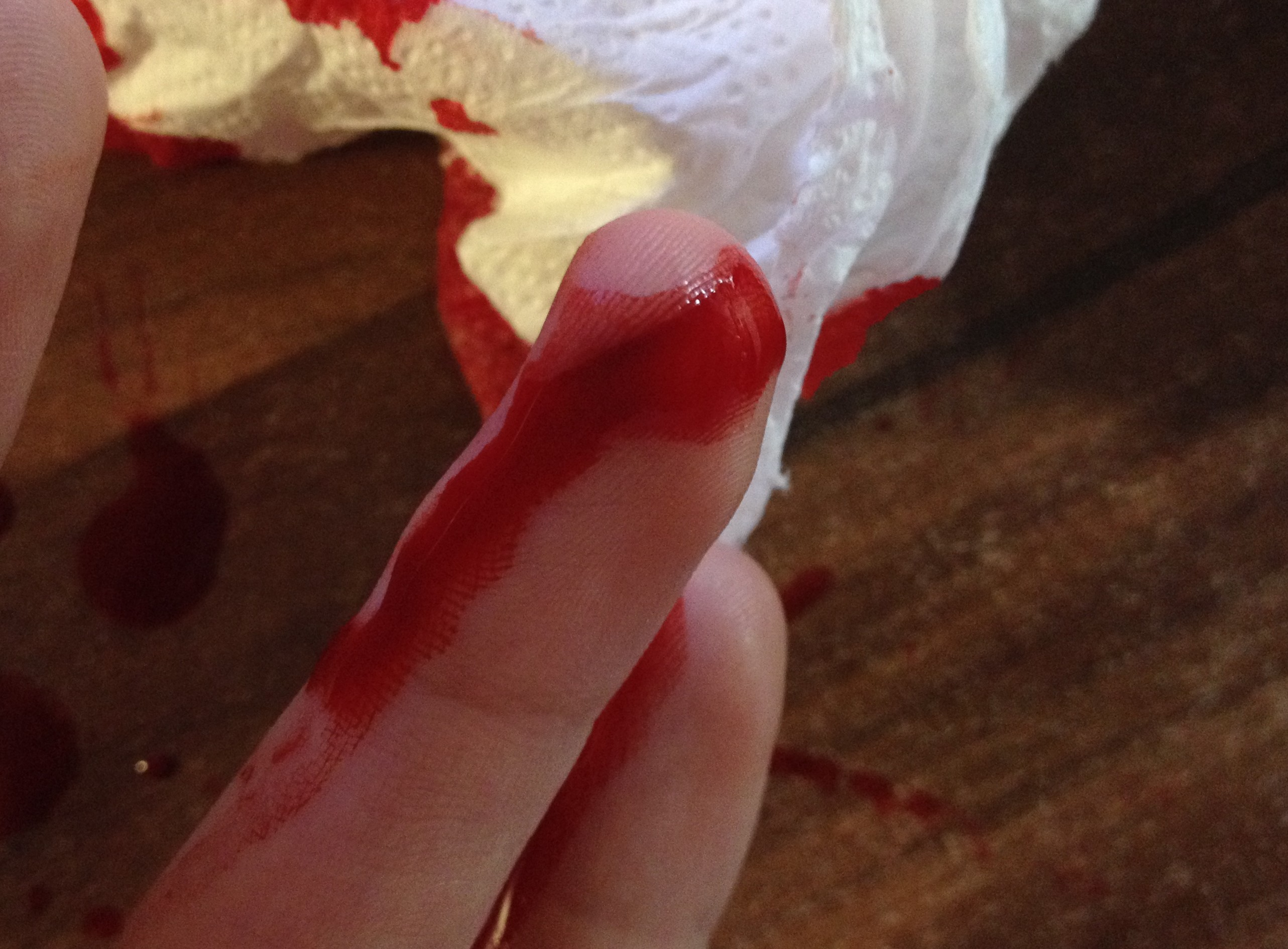
Fresh incisional wound on the fingertip of the left ring finger

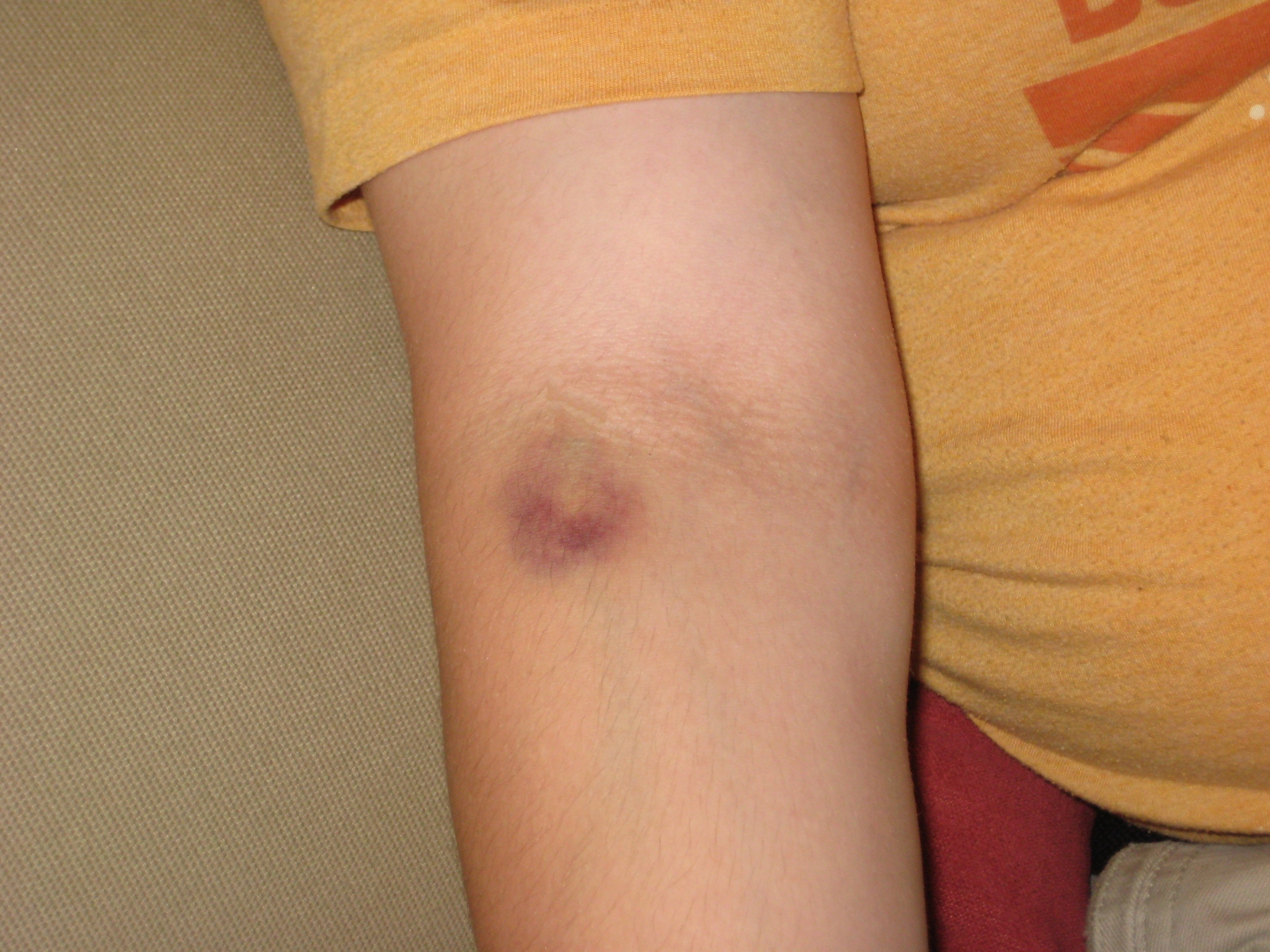
Bruise on arm

==== Fractures ====
Fractures can be classified as either open or closed, depending on whether the integrity of the overlying skin has been disrupted or preserved, respectively. Several classification systems have been developed to further characterize soft tissue injuries in the setting of an underlying fracture:

- Tscherne classification – Used to describe external appearance of wounds in both open and closed fractures.
- Gustilo-Anderson classification – Classifies open fractures based on wound size, extent of soft tissue loss, and degree of contamination.
- Hannover Fracture scale – Used in open fractures as an extremity salvage assessment.
- AO Classification – adapted from the Tscherne classification, provides separate grading system for skin, muscles/tendons, and neurovascular structures.

=== Chronic wounds ===
Any wound which is arrested or delayed during any of the normal stages of wound healing is considered to be a chronic wound. Most commonly, these are wounds which develop due to an underlying disease process such as diabetes mellitus or arterial/venous insufficiency. However, any acute wound has the potential to become a chronic wound if any of the normal stages of wound healing are interrupted. Chronic wounds are most commonly a result of disruption of the inflammatory phase of wound healing, however errors in any phase can result in a chronic wound. The exact duration of time which distinguishes a chronic wound from an acute wound is not clearly defined, although many clinicians agree that wounds which have not progressed for over three months are considered chronic wounds.

==== Common causes of chronic wounds ====
- Diabetes mellitus – Wound healing impairment in the setting of diabetes is multifactorial. Hyperglycemia, neuropathy, microvascular complications, impaired immune and inflammatory responses, and psychological factors have all been implicated in the formation and propagation of diabetic wounds. Feet are the most common location of diabetic wounds, although any type of wound can be negatively impacted by diabetes. It has been estimated that up to 25% of patients with diabetes mellitus will be affected by non-healing wounds in their lifetime.
- Venous/Arterial insufficiency – Impaired blood outflow (venous) or inflow (arterial) can both impair wound healing, thereby causing chronic wounds. Much like diabetes, venous/arterial insufficiency most commonly results in chronic wounds of the lower extremities. In chronic venous insufficiency, blood pooling impedes oxygen exchange and creates a chronic pro-inflammatory environment which both promote formation of venous ulcers. Peripheral artery disease, on the other hand, causes wounds due to poor blood inflow and typically affects the most distal extremities (fingers, toes).
- Immunologic disease – The immune system plays a critical role in the inflammatory process; therefore, any disease of the immune system has the potential to impair the inflammatory phase of wound healing, thereby leading to a chronic wound. Patients suffering from diseases such as rheumatoid arthritis and lupus have been found to have larger wounds and prolonged time to heal when compared to the general population.
- Pressure ulcer – Also known as decubitus ulcers or bedsores, this type of wound is a result of chronic pressure to the skin over a prolonged period. While most individuals have intact sensation and motor function which allow for frequent positional change to prevent the formation of such ulcers, older individuals are particularly susceptible to this type of chronic injury due to impaired neurosensory responses. Pressure ulcers can occur in as little as two hours of immobility in a bedridden patient or person who is otherwise unconscious/sedated (surgery, syncope, etc.). In the United States, pressure ulcers are graded using the National Pressure Injury Advisory Panel (NPIAP) system. In this system, ulcers are graded on wound depth with stage 1 being the least severe (erythema, intact skin) and stage 4 being full thickness damage through subcutaneous tissue down to muscle, tendon, or bone. Any ulcer that cannot be assessed due to overlying eschar is considered unstageable.

=== Wound sterility ===
Wound sterility, or degree of contamination of a wound, is a critical consideration when evaluating a wound. In the United States, the CDC's Surgical Wound Classification System is most commonly used for classification of a wound's sterility, specifically within a surgical setting. According to this classification system, four different classes of wound exist, each with their own postoperative risk of surgical site infection:

- Class 1 – clean wound: a wound that is not infected and without signs of inflammation. This type of wound is typically closed. By definition, this type of wound excludes any wounds of the respiratory, genital, alimentary, or urinary tract.
- Class 2 – clean-contaminated wound: a wound with a low level of contamination. May involve entry into the respiratory, genital, alimentary, or urinary tract.
- Class 3 – contaminated wound: an open, accidental wound resulting from trauma outside of a sterile setting is automatically considered a contaminated wound. Additionally, any surgical wound where there is a major break in sterile technique or obvious contamination from the gastrointestinal tract is considered a contaminated wound.
- Class 4 – dirty/infected: a wound with evidence of an existing clinical infection. Class 4 wounds are usually found in old traumatic wounds which were not adequately treated and will show evidence of devitalized tissue or gross purulence.

== Presentation ==
=== Workup ===
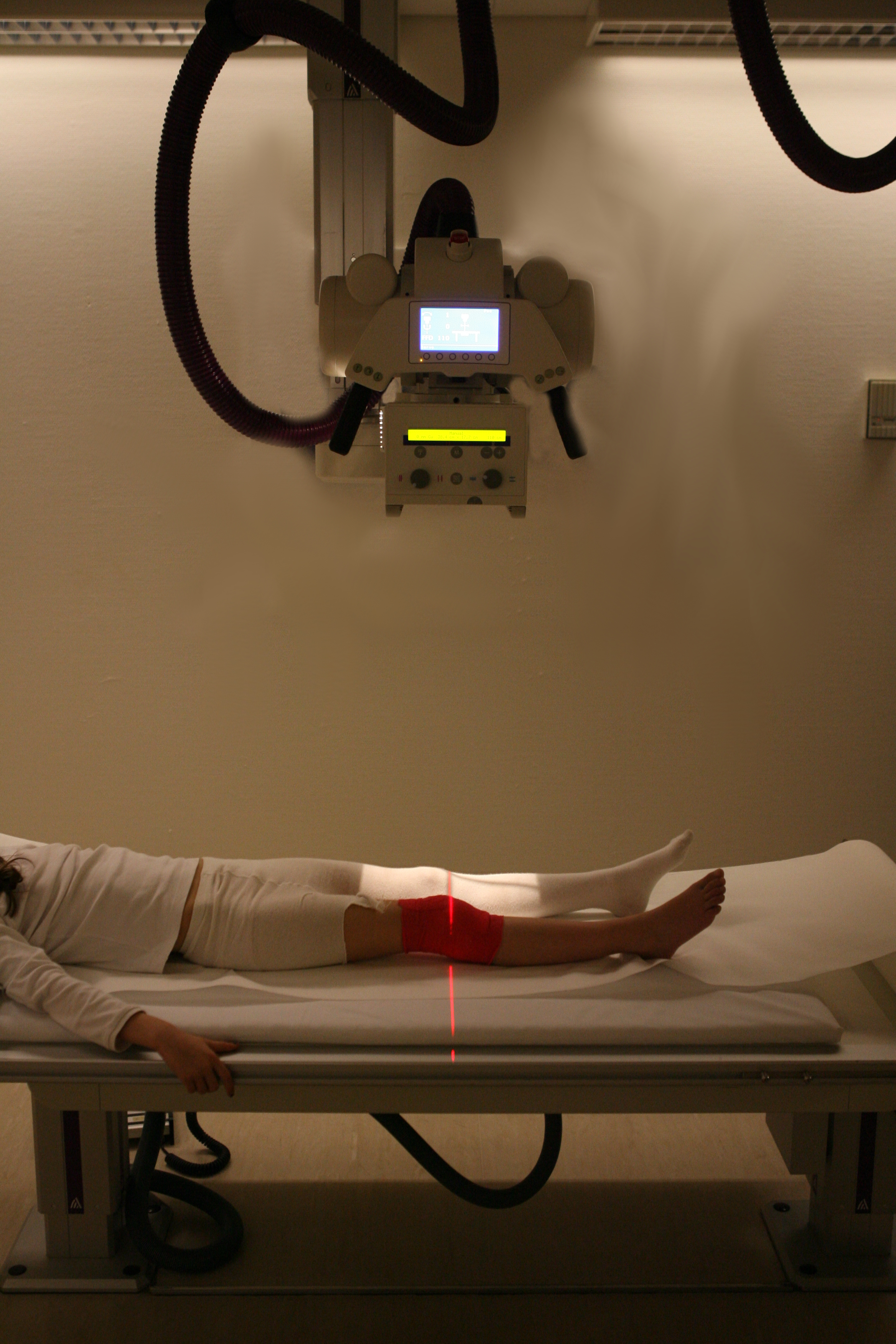
Plain radiography (x-ray) is used to ensure there are no hidden bone fractures in this patient's knee wound.

==== Physical examination ====
Wound presentation will vary greatly based on a number of factors, each of which is important to consider in order to establish a proper diagnosis and treatment plan. In addition to collecting a thorough history, the following factors should be considered when evaluating any wound:

- Size of wound: Should be accurately measured at time of initial presentation and regularly remeasured until wound resolution.
- Wound location: Very useful consideration in many chronic wounds, such as diabetic foot ulcers, pressure ulcers, and venous ulcers. Acute wounds will be located in areas consistent with the mechanism of injury (e.g. diagonal chest wall bruising from seatbelt following car accident).
- Wound bed: A healthy wound bed will appear pink due to healthy granulation tissue. Presence of a dark red wound bed which bleeds easily on contact or excess granulation tissue (i.e. hypergranulation tissue) may indicate the presence of an infection or non-healing wound.
- Wound depth: The depth of a wound is often not apparent on visual inspection alone. Proper evaluation of wound depth includes use of a probe to measure wound depth and evaluate for undermining of wound edges or sinus/fistula formation.
- Necrotic tissue, slough, eschar: Wounds may be covered with a layer of dead tissue which may appear cream/yellow in color (slough) or as a black, hardened tissue (eschar). Removing this tissue is critical for properly evaluating both the depth of a wound and quality of the wound bed, and promotes wound healing.
- Wound edges: May provide clues to cause of specific wounds, such as gently sloping edges of venous ulcers or rolled edges of certain tumors.
- Surrounding skin: Appearance of the surrounding skin can provide clues to underlying disease processes, such as redness/erythema due to cellulitis, maceration due to uncontrolled wound exudate, or eczematous changes due to a chronic irritation (e.g. allergic reaction to wound dressing).
- Infection: Classic signs of infection are redness, warmth, swelling, odor, and pain out of proportion to wound appearance.
- Pain: Pain can be nociceptive, neuropathic, or inflammatory, each of which can provide clues to the cause of a wound. Proper pain control is an important consideration in wound management, particularly in burn care where analgesia is often necessary prior to dressing changes.

A thorough wound evaluation, particularly evaluation of wound depth and removal of necrotic tissue, should be performed only by a licensed healthcare professional in order to avoid damage to nearby structures, infection, or worsening pain.

==== Diagnostics ====
Additional diagnostic tests may be needed during wound evaluation based on the cause, appearance, and age of a wound.

- Wound culture: If there is concern for infection, a wound can be more carefully evaluated for presence of bacteria via surface swabs, deep tissue biopsy, or needle biopsy. Surface swabs are most commonly used due to low cost, ease of use, and minimal pain to patient. Although swab cultures have been shown to reliably identify the organisms causing an infection, swabs are only able to identify bacteria on the surface of a wound and can occasionally be contaminated by normal skin flora. Deep tissue biopsy is considered the gold standard for diagnosing wound infections due to being both more accurate and precise than swabs. However, it is more invasive, more painful, and less cost effective than swabs and therefore is not the first choice for collecting wound cultures. Needle aspiration can only be implemented in wounds with underlying abscesses or fluid collections.
- Imaging: X-ray is useful to assess for an underlying fracture which may not be apparent on physical examination alone. Ultrasound, computed tomography (CT), and magnetic resonance imaging (MRI) can all be used to assess for identifying fluid collections, necrotic tissue, or inflammation. Ultrasound is portable, low cost, quickly implemented, and does not expose patients to radiation, but is limited in diagnostic capabilities. CT is another quickly implemented option which generally provides more diagnostic information compared to ultrasound, however it is less cost-effective and exposes patients to radiation. MRI offers the greatest image resolution and can provide diagnostic information on presence of soft tissue infection or bone infection. Like ultrasound, MRI does not expose patients to radiation, however it is the slowest and most difficult to implement of all of these imaging methods.
- Laboratory studies: Serum prealbumin levels may be useful in evaluating nutrition status in patients with chronic wounds or at risk for developing chronic wounds. Elevated erythrocyte sedimentation rate (ESR) and C-reactive protein (CRP) can confirm presence of an infection but alone are not diagnostic. Routine bloodwork such as a basic metabolic panel (BMP) or complete blood count (CBC) are not typically required but may be useful in select circumstances.
- Ankle-brachial index/toe-brachial index (ABI/TBI): These tests can be used to assess blood supply to the lower extremities and their results may affect management of lower extremity wounds such as venous/arterial ulcers, diabetic foot ulcers, or pressure ulcers.

== Management ==
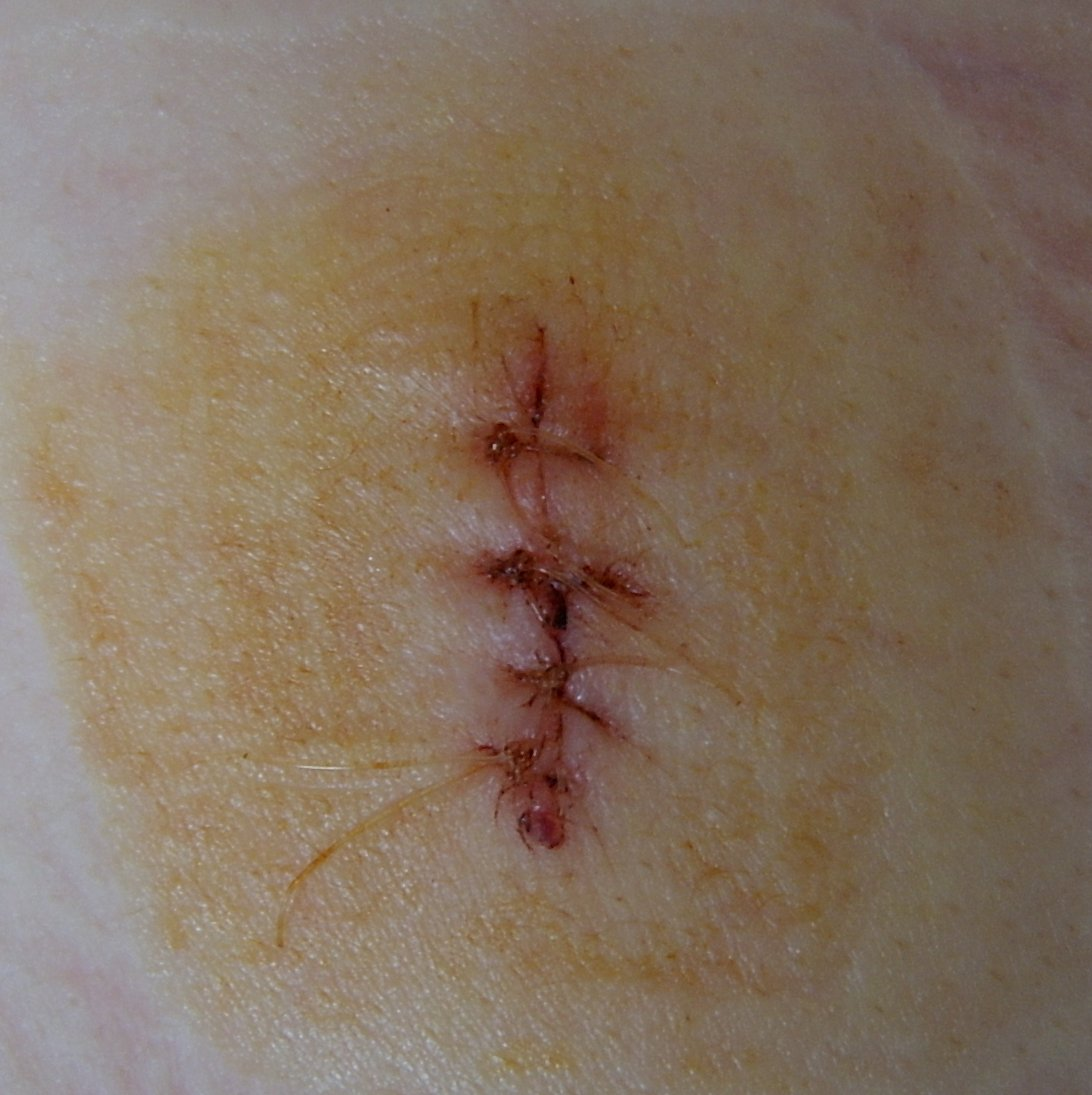
Wound, sewn with four stitches

The goal of wound care is to promote an environment that allows a wound to heal as quickly as possible, with emphasis on restoring both form and function of the wounded area. Although optimal treatment strategies vary greatly depending on the specific cause, size, and age of a particular wound, there are universal principles of wound management that apply to all wounds. After a thorough evaluation is performed, all wounds should be properly irrigated and debrided. Proper cleansing of a wound is critical to prevent infection and promote re-epithelialization. Further efforts should be made to eliminate/limit any contributing factors to the wound (e.g. diabetes, pressure, etc.) and optimize the wound's healing ability (i.e. optimize nutritional status). The end goal of wound management is closure of the wound which can be achieved by primary closure, delayed primary closure, or healing by secondary intention, each of which is discussed below. Pain control is a mainstay of wound management, as wound evaluation, wound cleansing, and dressing changes can be a painful process.

=== Irrigation ===
Proper cleansing of a wound is critical in preventing infection and promoting healing of any wound. Irrigation is defined as constant flow of a solution over the surface of a wound. The goal of irrigation is not only to remove debris and potential contaminants from a wound, but also to assist in visual inspection of a wound and hydrate the wound. Irrigation is typically achieved with either a bulb or syringe and needle/catheter. The preferred solution for irrigation is normal saline which is readily accessible in the emergency department, although recent studies have shown no difference in emergency department infection rates when comparing normal saline to potable tap water. Irrigation can also be achieved with a diluted 1% povidone iodine solution, but studies have again shown no difference in infection rates when compared to normal saline. Irrigation with antiseptic solutions, such as non-diluted povidone iodine, chlorhexidine, and hydrogen peroxide is not preferred since these solutions are toxic to tissue and inhibit wound healing. The exact volume of irrigation used will vary depending on the appearance of the wound, although some sources have reported 50–100 mL of irrigation per 1 cm of wound length as a guideline.

=== Debridement ===
Debridement is defined as removal of devitalized or dead tissue, particularly necrotic tissue, eschar, or slough. Debridement is a critical aspect of wound care because devitalized tissue, particularly necrotic tissue, serves as nutrients for bacteria thereby promoting infection. Additionally, devitalized tissue creates a physical barrier over a wound which limits the effectiveness of any applied topical compounds and prevents re-epithelialization. Lastly, devitalized tissue, especially eschar, prevents accurate assessment of underlying tissue, making appropriate assessment of a wound impossible without adequate debridement. Debridement can be achieved in several ways:

- Autolytic debridement: The most conservative type of debridement whereby the body's own natural defenses break down necrotic tissue via phagocytes and proteolytic enzymes. This method requires a moist environment and intact immune system.
- Mechanical debridement: Achieved through use of mechanical force to remove devitalized tissue (e.g. wet-to-dry dressing, pressurized wound irrigation, pulse-lavage); however, this process will remove both healthy and non-healthy tissue and is therefore considered a non-selective debridement method.
- Enzymatic debridement: A process of debridement in which enzymes such as proteinases or collagenases are applied topically to digest devitalized tissue. Depending on the agent, this process can be either selective or non-selective. Examples include trypsin, streptokinase-streptodornase combination, subtilisin, papain, and collagenase.
- Surgical debridement: Also known as sharp debridement, this is a process in which devitalized tissue is removed through use of surgical instruments such as scalpels, curettes, or surgical scissors. Surgical debridement can be done in a hospital bed, in an outpatient clinic, or in an operating room depending on the particular wound, risk of bleeding, and anesthesia requirements.
- Biological debridement: Also known as larval therapy, biological debridement is done through controlled application of sterile larvae (Lucilia sericata) to the wound bed. These larvae release proteolytic enzymes which dissolve necrotic tissue before then ingesting the now debrided tissue. Biologic debridement has the added benefit of being bactericidal since larvae will ingest bacteria as well as devitalized tissue. Despite the safety and effectiveness of this method, its applications are often limited due to patient's negative feelings towards larvae which are commonly associated with poor hygiene and perishable food.

=== Closure ===
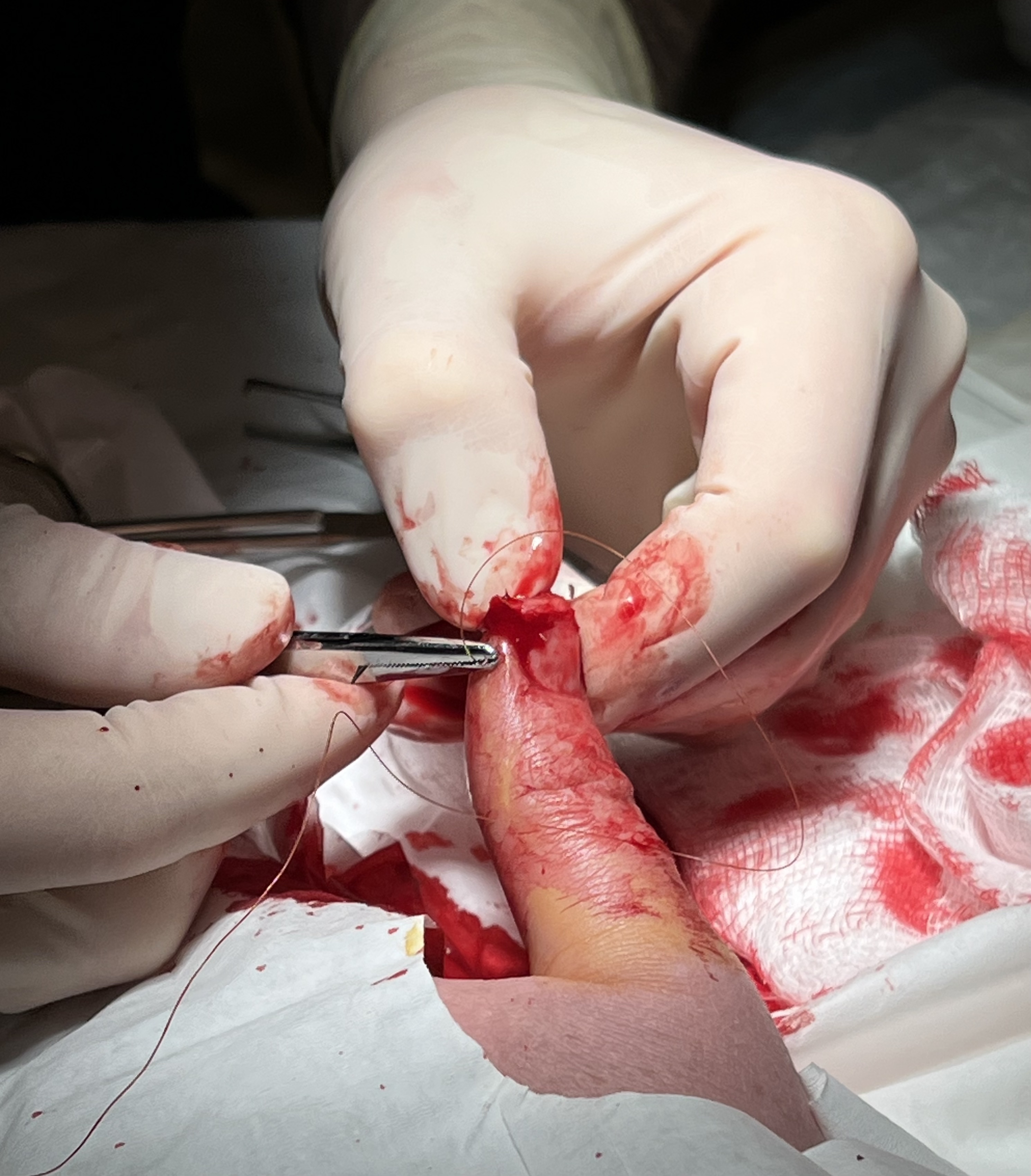
A surgeon placing a suture

The end goal of wound care is to re-establish the integrity of the skin, a structure which serves as a barrier to the external environment. The preferred method of closure is to reattach/reapproximate the wound edges together, a process known as primary closure/healing by primary intention. Wounds that have not been closed within several hours of the initial injury or wounds that are concerning for infection will often be left open and treated with dressings for several days before being closed 3–5 days later, a process known as delayed primary closure. The exact duration of time from initial injury in which delayed primary closure is preferred over primary closure is not clearly defined. Wounds that cannot be closed primarily due to substantial tissue loss can be healed by secondary intention, a process in which the wound is allowed to fill-in over time through natural physiologic processes. When healing by secondary intention, granulation tissue grows in from the wound edges slowly over time to restore integrity of the skin. Healing by secondary intention can take up to months, requires daily wound care, and leaves an unfavorable scar, thus primary closure is always preferred when possible. As an alternative, wounds that cannot be closed primarily can be addressed with skin grafting or flap reconstruction, typically done by a plastic surgeon. There are several methods that can be implemented to achieve primary closure of a wound, including suture, staples, skin adhesive, and surgical strips. Suture is the most frequently used for closure. There are many types of suture, but broadly they can be categorized as absorbable vs non-absorbable and synthetic vs natural. Absorbable sutures have the added benefit of not requiring removal and are often preferred in children for this reason. Staples are less time-consuming and more cost effective than suture but have a risk of worse scarring if left in place for too long. Adhesive glue and sutures have comparable cosmetic outcomes for minor lacerations <5 cm in adults and children. The use of adhesive glue involves considerably less time for the doctor and less pain for the person. The wound opens at a slightly higher rate but there is less redness. The risk for infections (1.1%) is the same for both. Adhesive glue should not be used in areas of high tension or repetitive movements, such as joints or the posterior trunk.

=== Dressings ===
After a wound is irrigated, debrided, and, if possible, closed, it should be dressed appropriately. The goals of a wound dressing are to act as a barrier to the outside environment, facilitate wound healing, promote hemostasis, and act as a form of mechanical debridement during dressing changes. The ideal wound dressing maintains a moist environment to optimize wound healing but is also capable of absorbing excess fluid as to avoid skin maceration or bacterial growth. Several wound dressing options are available, each tailored to different kinds of wounds:

- Gauze: Composed of woven or non-woven cotton, rayon, and polyester, gauze is highly absorbent, but removal can be uncomfortable.
- Films: Films are made of translucent polyurethane which is adherent to skin and semi-occlusive, allowing them to retain within the dressing but also allow for exchange of gases such as oxygen and carbon dioxide. The translucent nature of this dressing makes monitoring wounds simple.
- Hydrocolloids: Consist of an outer, water-impermeable layer and an inner layer made of colloid. When the inner colloid layer comes in contact with liquid, it becomes a gel allowing the dressing to maintain a moist environment while simultaneously absorbing exudate. Hydrocolloids cause minimal pain on removal but are at increased risk of skin maceration and bacterial growth.
- Hydrogels: An insoluble, hydrophilic material with soothing properties which is useful in treating burn wounds, dry chronic wounds, and pressure ulcers. Like hydrocolloids, hydrogels are capable of retaining excess moisture leading to skin maceration and bacterial growth.
- Foams: A flexible material with a hydrophobic outer layer that shields liquid from the outside environment, while having a highly absorptive inner layer which is ideal for highly exuding wounds. Foams should not be used in dryer wounds that require exudate to stay moist.
- Alginates: Derived from seaweed, alginates can absorb up to 15–20 times their weight in liquid and are ideal for highly exudative wounds. Like hydrocolloids, alginates form a gel when they come in contact with fluid, making removal relatively painless.
- Hydrofibers: A derivative of hydrocolloid dressings, hydrofibers are able to absorb up to 25 times their weight in fluid, making them the most absorbent dressing. They are much like alginate dressings in their absorptive capacity and tendency to form a gel upon contact with liquid.
- Medicated dressings: Many dressings come impregnated with medication, typically antimicrobial agents or debriding chemicals. Silver, iodine, growth hormones, enzymes, and antibacterial agents are most common.
- Negative-pressure wound therapy (NPWT): A unique type of dressing which consists of a foam dressing surrounded with an airtight film and then connected to power-assisted vacuum suction, creating a negative pressure environment over the wound. This negative pressure environment is thought to promote formation of granulation tissue and decrease inflammatory fluid. NPWT has the added benefit of requiring less frequent dressing changes, a process that is often painful for patients. Since its implementation, NPWT has been implemented broadly for chronic non-healing wounds but can also be applied to acute wounds that cannot be closed primarily due to swelling or concern for infection. This type of dressing is typically applied in the operating room but can be done at bedside with appropriate analgesia.

=== Maintenance and surveillance ===
Ideally, wound dressings should be changed daily to promote a clean environment and allow for daily evaluation of wound progression. Highly exudative wounds and infected wounds should be monitored closely and may require more frequent dressing changes. Negative pressure wound dressings can be changed less frequently, every 2–3 days. Wound progression over time can be monitored with transparent sheet tracings or photographs, each of which produce reliable measurements of wound surface area.

=== Alternative medicine ===
There is moderate evidence that honey is more effective than antiseptic followed by gauze for healing wounds infected after surgical operations. There is a lack of quality evidence relating to the use of honey on other types of wounds, such as minor acute wounds, mixed acute and chronic wounds, pressure ulcers, Fournier's gangrene, venous leg ulcers, diabetic foot ulcers and Leishmaniasis.

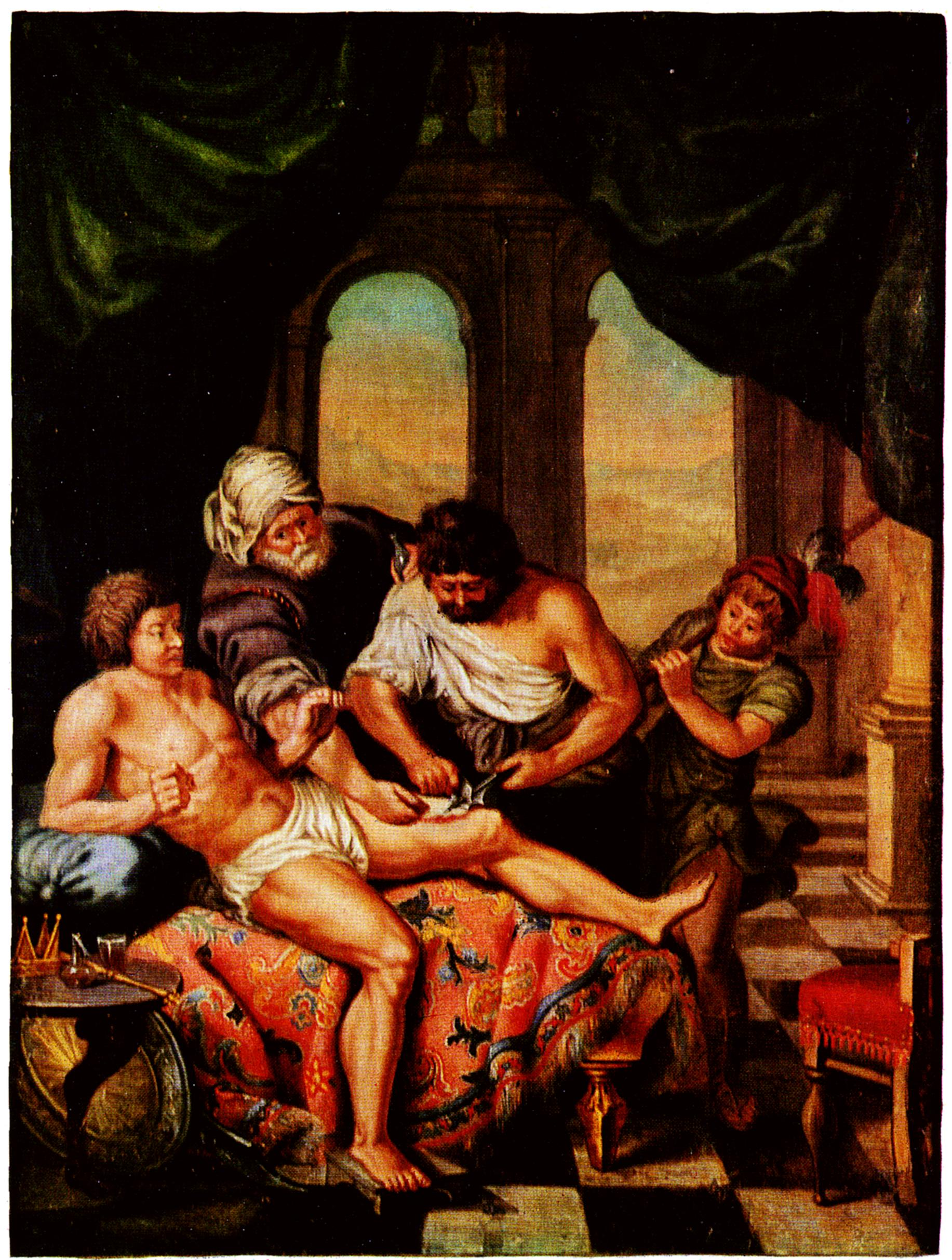
Medieval treatment of wound with lance gritting, used to avoid further infection

Therapeutic touch has been implicated as a complementary therapy in wound healing; however, there is no high quality research supporting its use as an evidence based clinical intervention. More than 400 species of plants are identified as potentially useful for wound healing. Only three randomized controlled trials, however, have been done for the treatment of burns.

== History ==
From the Classical Period to the Medieval Period, the body and the soul were believed to be intimately connected, based on several theories put forth by the philosopher Plato. Wounds on the body were believed to correlate with wounds to the soul and vice versa; wounds were seen as an outward sign of an inward illness. Thus, a man who was wounded physically in a serious way was said to be hindered not only physically but spiritually as well. If the soul was wounded, that wound may also eventually become physically manifest, revealing the true state of the soul. Wounds were also seen as writing on the "tablet" of the body. Wounds acquired in war, for example, told the story of a soldier in a form which all could see and understand, and the wounds of a martyr told the story of their faith.

== See also ==
- European Wound Management Association
- International Red Cross Wound Classification System
- Wound bed preparation
