= Rytis =

- Gender: Male
- Language: Lithuanian
- Name day: 2 February

Origin
- Region of origin: Lithuania

Rytis is a Lithuanian masculine given name. Individuals with the name Rytis include:

- Rytis Juknevičius (born 1993), Lithuanian basketball player
- Rytis Leliūga (born 1987), Lithuanian footballer
- Rytis Rimdeika (born 1966), Lithuanian medical doctor, scientist and professor
- Rytis Mažulis (born 1961), Lithuanian composer
- Rytis Sakalauskas (born 1987), Lithuanian track and field sprint athlete
- Rytis Vaišvila (born 1971), Lithuanian basketball player and coach
- Rytis Zemkauskas (born 1969), Lithuanian journalist, writer, broadcaster and a film director
