= Tiltas 2024 =

- Season 2
- Presented by: Rytis Zemkauskas
- No. of days: 13
- No. of castaways: 14
- Winner: Algimantas Žadeikis
- Runners-up: Virginijus Bertulis; Akvilė Vitunskaitė
- Location: Telšiai District, Lithuania
- No. of episodes: 12

Release
- Original network: Telia Play
- Original release: 3 October – 5 December 2024

Season chronology
- ← Previous; 2023

Tiltas 2024 (The Bridge 2024) also known as Tiltas 2 is the second season of the Lithuanian version of The Bridge. The season is set in the Telšiai District in Lithuania where 14 contestants are tasked with building a 300 metre bridge entirely out of wood in 13 days to reach a small isle containing the grand prize of €50,000. The season has a twist where for the first time, the contestants are divided into two teams where they have no idea of the existence of the other team. The season is narrated by Rytis Zemkauskas and premiered on streaming service Telia Play on 3 October 2024. The season concluded on 5 December 2024 where Algimantas Žadeikis got the most votes amongst his fellow contestants to receive the grand prize and be crowned the winner.

== Contestants ==
All contestant's age are listed from entry into the game.

Contestant	Age on entry	Residence	Starting Team	Switched Team	Unification	Entered	Exited	Status	Finish
Rapolas Micevičius	34	Klaipėda	South Team	South Team		Day 1	Day 7	Eliminated; Day 7	14th
Artūras Lubys	41	Sandefjord, Norway	South Team	South Team	Unification	Day 1	Day 13	Lost Vote; Day 13	13th
Ashraf Beshara	37	Vilnius	North Team	South Team	Unification	Day 1	Day 13	Lost Vote; Day 13	12th
Darius Martinkus	43	Elektrėnai	North Team	North Team	Unification	Day 1	Day 13	Lost Vote; Day 13	11th
Gediminas Simutis	37	Klaipėda			Unification	Day 8	Day 13	Lost Vote; Day 13	10th
Iveta Grakulskytė	31	Vilnius	North Team	North Team	Unification	Day 1	Day 13	Lost Vote; Day 13	9th
Kamilė Pociūtė	21	Plungė	South Team	South Team	Unification	Day 1	Day 13	Lost Vote; Day 13	8th
Kristina Vogulė	46	Padovinys	North Team	North Team	Unification	Day 1	Day 13	Lost Vote; Day 13	7th
Laurita Gruodytė–Žilė	48	Zarasai	North Team	North Team	Unification	Day 1	Day 13	Lost Vote; Day 13	6th
Raminta Bilevičienė	33	Marijampolė	North Team	North Team	Unification	Day 1	Day 13	Lost Vote; Day 13	5th
Sigitas Ramanauskas	33	Klaipėda	South Team	South Team	Unification	Day 1	Day 13	Lost Vote; Day 13	4th
Zigmas Slušnys	32	Vilnius	South Team	South Team	Unification	Day 1	Day 13	Lost Vote; Day 13	4th
Akvilė Vitunskaitė	28	Alytus	South Team	South Team	Unification	Day 1	Day 13	2nd Runner-up; Day 13	3rd
Virginijus Bertulis	31	Trušeliai	North Team	North Team	Unification	Day 1	Day 13	Runner-up; Day 13	2nd
Algimantas Žadeikis	31	Vilnius	South Team	South Team	Unification	Day 1	Day 13	Winner; Day 13	1st
