= Open fracture =

An open fracture, also called a compound fracture, is a type of bone fracture (broken bone) that has an open wound in the skin near the fractured bone. The skin wound is usually caused by the bone breaking through the surface of the skin. An open fracture can be life threatening or limb-threatening (person may be at risk of losing a limb) due to the risk of a deep infection and/or bleeding. Open fractures are often caused by high energy trauma such as road traffic accidents and are associated with a high degree of damage to the bone and nearby soft tissue. Other potential complications include nerve damage or impaired bone healing, including malunion or nonunion. The severity of open fractures can vary. For diagnosing and classifying open fractures, Gustilo-Anderson open fracture classification is the most commonly used method. This classification system can also be used to guide treatment, and to predict clinical outcomes. Advanced trauma life support is the first line of action in dealing with open fractures and to rule out other life-threatening condition in cases of trauma. The person is also administered antibiotics for at least 24 hours to reduce the risk of an infection.

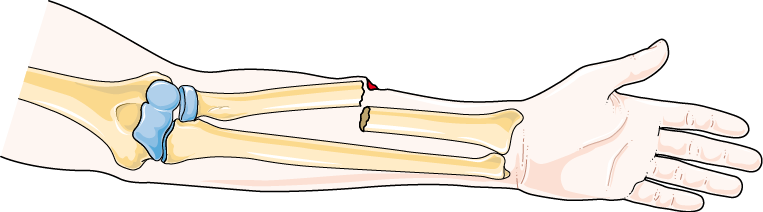
Diagram of an open, transverse, midshaft radius fracture

Cephalosporins, sometimes with aminoglycosides, are generally the first line of antibiotics and are used usually for at least three days. Therapeutic irrigation, wound debridement, early wound closure and bone fixation core principles in management of open fractures. All these actions aimed to reduce the risk of infections and promote bone healing. The bone that is most commonly injured is the tibia and working-age young men are the group of people who are at highest risk of an open fracture. Older people with osteoporosis and soft-tissue problems are also at risk.

== Epidemiology ==
Crush injuries are the most common form of injuries, followed by falls from standing height, and road traffic accidents. Open fractures tend to occur more often in males than females at the ratio of 7 to 3 and the age of onset of 40.8 and 56 years respectively. In terms of anatomy location, fractures of finger phalanges are the most common one at the rate of 14 per 100,000 people per year in the general population, followed by fracture of tibia at 3.4 per 100,000 population per year, and distal radius fracture at 2.4 per 100,000 population per year. Infection rates for Gustilo Grade I fractures is 1.4%, followed by 3.6% for Grade II fractures, 22.7% for Grade IIIA fractures, and 10 to 50% of Grade IIIB and IIIC fractures.

== Signs and symptoms ==
There are a range of characteristics of open fractures as the severity of the injury can vary greatly. Most open fractures are characterized by a broken bone that is sticking out of the skin, but there can also be a broken bone that is associated with a very small "poke-hole" skin wound. Both of these injuries are classified as open fractures. Some open fractures can have significant blood loss. Most open fractures have extensive damage to soft tissues near and around the bone such as nerves, tendons, muscles, and blood vessels.

== Causes ==
Open fractures can occur due to direct impacts such as high-energy physical forces (trauma), motor vehicular accidents, firearms, and falls from height. Indirect mechanisms include twisting (torsional injuries) and falling from a standing position. These mechanisms are usually associated with substantial degloving of the soft-tissues, but can also have a subtler appearance with a small poke hole and accumulation of clotted blood in the tissues. Depending on the nature of the trauma, it can cause different types of fractures:

=== Common fractures ===
Bone fractures result from significant trauma to the bone. This trauma can come from a variety of forces – a direct blow, axial loading, angular forces, torque, or a mixture of these. There are various fracture types, including closed, open, stress, simple, comminuted, greenstick, displaced, transverse, oblique.

=== Pathological fractures ===
Result from minor trauma to diseased bone. These preexisting processes include metastatic lesions, bone cysts, advanced osteoporosis, etc.

=== Fracture-dislocations ===
Severe injury in which both fracture and dislocation take place simultaneously.

=== Gunshot wounds ===
Caused by high-speed projectiles, they cause damage as they go through the tissue, through secondary shock wave and cavitation.

== Diagnosis ==
The initial evaluation for open fractures is to rule out any other life-threatening injuries. Advanced Trauma Life Support (ATLS) is the initial protocol to rule out such injuries. Once the patient is stabilised, orthopedic injuries can be evaluated including determining the severity of injury using a classification system. Mechanism of injury is important to know the amount energy that is transferred to the patient and the level of contamination. Every limb should be exposed to evaluate any other hidden injuries. Characteristics of the wound should be noted in detail. Neurology and the vascular status of the affected limb are important to rule out any nerve or blood vessels injuries. High index of suspicion of compartment syndrome should be maintained for leg and forearm fractures.

=== Classification ===
There are a number of classification systems attempting to categorise open fractures such as Gustilo-Anderson open fracture classification, Tscherne classification, and Müller AO Classification of fractures. However, Gustilo-Anderson open fracture classification is the most commonly used classification system. Gustilo system grades the fracture according to energy of injury, soft tissue damage, level of contamination, and comminution of fractures. The higher the grade, the worse the outcome of the fracture.

	Gustilo Open Fracture Classification
Gustilo Grade	Definition
I	Open fracture, clean wound, wound <1 cm in length
II	Open fracture, wound > 1 cm but < 10 cm in length without extensive soft-tissue damage, flaps, avulsions
IIIA	Open fracture with adequate soft tissue coverage of a fractured bone despite extensive soft tissue laceration or flaps, or high-energy trauma (gunshot and farm injuries) regardless of the size of the wound
IIIB	Open fracture with extensive soft-tissue loss and periosteal stripping and bone damage. Usually associated with massive contamination. Will often need further soft-tissue coverage procedure (i.e. free or rotational flap)
IIIC	Open fracture associated with an arterial injury requiring repair, irrespective of degree of soft-tissue injury.

Gustilo Type III Open fracture
- Specialty: Orthopedics

However, Gustilo system is not without its limitations. The system has limited interobserver reliability at 50% to 60%. The size of injury on the skin surface does not necessarily reflect the extent of deep underlying soft tissue injury. Therefore, the true grading of Gustilo can only be done in operating theatre.

== Management ==
=== Acute management ===
Urgent interventions, including therapeutic irrigation and wound debridement, are often necessary to clean the area of injury and minimize the risk of infection. Other risks of delayed intervention include long-term complications, such as deep infection, vascular compromise and complete limb loss. After wound irrigation, dry or wet gauze should be applied to the wound to prevent bacterial contamination. Taking photographs of the wound can help to reduce the need of multiple examinations by different doctors, which could be painful. Limb should be reduced and placed in a well-padded splint for immobilization of fractures. Pulses should be documented before and after reduction.

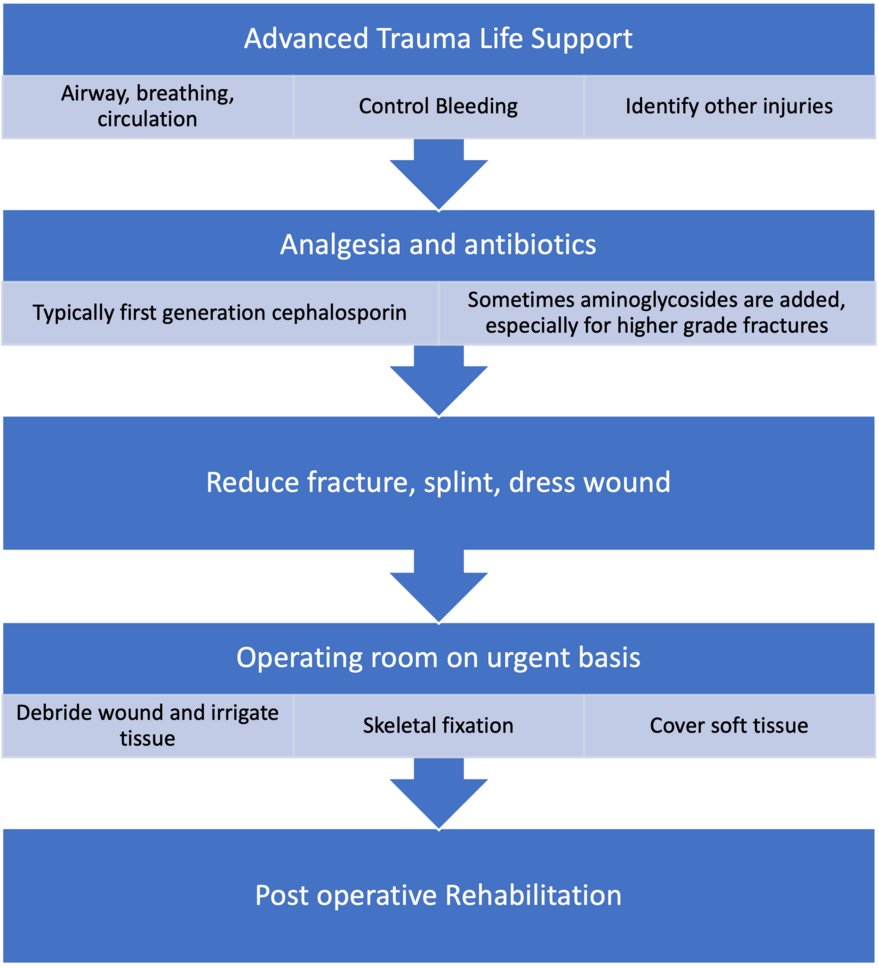
This flowchart describes the treatment steps for an individual with an open fracture. Note: Diagnostic steps such as obtaining imaging are excluded.

Wound cultures are positive in 22% of pre-debridement cultures and 60% of post-debridement cultures of infected cases. Therefore, pre-operative cultures no longer recommended. The value of post-operative cultures is unknown. Tetanus prophylaxis is routinely given to enhance immune response against Clostridium tetani. Anti-tetanus immunoglobulin is only indicated for those with highly contaminated wounds with uncertain vaccination history. Single intramuscular dose of 3000 to 5000 units of tetanus immunoglobulin is given to provide immediate immunity.

Another important clinical decision during acute management of open fractures involves the effort to avoid preventable amputations, where functional salvage of the limb is clearly desirable. Care must be taken to ensure this decision is not solely based on an injury severity tool score, but rather a decision made following a full discussion of options between doctors and the person, along with their family and care team.

=== Antibiotics ===
Administration of broad-spectrum intravenous antibiotics as soon as possible (within an hour ideally) is necessary to reduce the risk of infection. However, antibiotics may not provide necessary benefits in open finger fractures and low velocity firearms injury. First generation cephalosporin (cefazolin) is recommended as first line antibiotics for the treatment of open fractures. The antibiotic is useful against gram positive cocci and gram negative rods such as Escherichia coli, Proteus mirabilis, and Klebsiella pneumoniae. To extend the coverage of antibiotics against more bacteria in Type III Gustilo fractures, combination of first generation cephalosporin and aminoglycoside (gentamicin or tobramycin) or a third generation cephalosporin is recommended to cover against nosocomial gram negative bacilli such as Pseudomonas aeruginosa. Adding penicillin to cover for gas gangrene caused by anaerobic bacteria Clostridium perfringens is a controversial practice. Studies has shown that such practice may not be necessary as the standard antibiotic regimen is enough to cover for Clostridial infections. Antibiotic impregnated devices such as tobramycin impregnated Poly(methyl methacrylate) (PMMA) beads and antibiotic bone cement are helpful in reducing rates of infection. The use of absorbable carriers with implant coatings at the time of surgical fixation is also an effective means of delivering local antibiotics.

There has been no agreement on the optimal duration of antibiotics. Studies has shown that there is no additional benefits of risk of infection when giving antibiotics for one day, when compared to giving antibiotics for three days or five days. However, at present, there is only low to moderate evidence for this and more research is needed. Some authors recommended that antibiotics to be given for three doses for Gustilo Grade I fractures, for one day after wound closure in Grade II fractures, three days in Grade IIIA fractures, and three days after wound closure for Grade IIIB and IIIC.

=== Wound irrigation ===
There has been no agreement for the optimal solution for wound irrigation. Studies found out that there is no difference in infection rates by using normal saline or other various forms of water (distilled, boiled, or tap). There is also no difference in infection rates when using normal saline with castile soap compared with normal saline together with bacitracin in irrigating wounds. Studies also have shown that there is no difference in infection rates using low pressure pulse lavage (LPPL) when compared to high pressure pulse lavage (HPPL) in irrigating wounds. Optimal amount of fluid for irrigation also has not been established. It is recommended that the amount of irrigation solution to be determined by the severity of the fracture, with 3 litres for type I fractures, 6 litres for type II fractures, and 9 litres for type III fractures.

=== Wound debridement ===
The purpose of wound debridement is to remove all contaminated and non-viable tissues including skin, subcutaneous fat, muscles and bones. Viability of bones and soft tissues are determined by their capacity to bleed. Meanwhile, the viability of muscles is determined by colour, contractility, consistency, and their capacity to bleed. The optimal timing of performing wound debridement and closure is debated and dependent on the severity of the injury, resources and antibiotics available, and individual needs. Debridement time can vary from 6 to 72 hours, and closure time can be immediate (less than 72 hours) or delayed (72 hours to up to 3 months). There is no difference in infection rates for performing surgery within 6 hours of injury when compared to until 72 hours after injury. NICE guidelines suggest that the surgical debridement should be done immediately for open fracture that are highly contaminated or where there is a lot of bleeding (vascular compromise). For high-energy open fractures that are not highly contaminated NICE guidelines suggest surgical debridement within 12 hours of the accident, and for other open fractures within 24 hours.

=== Surgical management ===
Early fracture immobilisation and fixation helps to prevent further soft tissue injury and promotes wound and bone healing. This is especially important in the treatment of intraarticular fractures where early fixation allows early joint motion to prevent joint stiffness. Fracture management depends on the person's overall well-being, fracture pattern and location, and the extent of soft tissue injury. Both reamed and unreamed intramedullary nailing are accepted surgical treatments for open tibial fracture. Both techniques have similar rates of postoperative healing, postoperative infection, implant failure and compartment syndrome. Unreamed intramedullary nailing is advantageous because it has a lower incidence of superficial infection and malunion compared to external fixation. However, unreamed intramedullary nailing can result in high rates of hardware failure if a person's weight bearing after surgery is not closely controlled. Compared to external fixation, unreamed intramedullary nailing has similar rates of deep infection, delayed union and nonunion following surgery. For open tibial fractures in children, there is an increasing trend of using orthopedic cast rather than external fixation. Bone grafting is also helpful in fracture repair. However, internal fixation using plates and screws is not recommended as it increase the rate of infection. Amputation is a last resort intervention, and is determined by factors such as tissue viability and coverage, infection, and the extent of damage to the vascular system.

=== Wound management and closure ===
Early wound closure is recommended to reduce the rates hospital-acquired infection. For Grade I and II fractures, wound can be healed by secondary intention or through primary closure. There is conflicting evident to suggest the effectiveness of Negative-pressure wound therapy (vacuum dressing), with several sources citing a decreased risk in infection, and others suggesting no proven benefit.

=== Adjunct Treatments ===
A limited number of studies have assessed the efficacy of recombinant human bone morphogenetic protein-2 (rhBMP-2) on healing and infection risk. Results are encouraging, but no conclusive answers have been agreed upon to date.

Prophylactic bone grafting, typically performed after the wound has been closed for two weeks but within 12 weeks of injury, may help those treated with external fixation heal faster. Bone graft can be impregnated with antibiotics to theoretically decrease infection risk.

=== Complications ===
When a bone is broken and exposed to the outside environment, the probability of infection increases. Both the surrounding soft tissues can become infected, as well as the bone itself, which is called osteomyelitis. Additional complications include the broken bone ends not healing, called non-union, and the broken bone ends healing in an incorrect orientation, called malunion. Open fractures of long bones may cause subsequent damage to surrounding tissue resulting in compartment syndrome. Additionally there is potential for fat embolism development, both requiring acute intervention. Lastly, open fractures commonly occur in the setting of traumatic experiences, and the co-occurrence of these events may lead to chronic pain and mental health disorders. The setting or mechanism of injury of the open fracture can have an effect on the risk of infection, for example, external objects or dirt in the wound increase the risk of infection.

== Outcomes ==
=== Infection ===
The infection rate of open fractures depend on characteristics of the injury, type and timing of treatment, and patient factors. Higher rates of infection are associated with a higher Gustilo classification, where the risk of infection with a grade III fracture are up to 19.2% and a grade I or II fracture can have a 7.2% risk of infection. Deep infection is more likely with increasing amounts of time between injury sustainment and antibiotic administration. There is an increased risk of infection in patients who smoke or have diabetes. The most common pathogen implicated in infected open fractures is Staphylococcus aureus. In adults with open fractures treated surgically, a comparative study found that 90-day surgical site infection rates were similar whether the operative field was prepared with iodine povacrylex in isopropyl alcohol or with chlorhexidine gluconate in isopropyl alcohol, and there was no clear difference in unplanned fracture-related reoperations at one year.

== History ==
In Ancient Egypt, physicians were diagnosing and treating open fractures. Treatment consisted of manual reduction, where the broken bone is made to be straight again with physical maneuvers, and then application of splints and topical ointments. Splints were constructed using linen and sticks or tree bark. A topical ointment consisting of honey, grease, and lint made from vegetable fiber were then applied daily to the open fracture. However, the Ancient Egyptians noted open fractures to have a poor prognosis, and fifth dynasty graves have been discovered containing people who had died from open fractures.

During the 19th century Crimean War, the use of plaster-of-paris for the stabilization of open and closed fractures was pioneered. It has been reported that the pioneering Russian surgeon who introduced the novel technique had been inspired by watching sculptors creating works of art.

Before the 1850s, surgeons usually amputated the limbs for those with open fractures, as it was associated with severe sepsis and gangrene which can be life-threatening. It was not until the latter half of the 19th century, when Joseph Lister adopted the aseptic technique in surgeries, that the rate of death from open fractures reduced from 50% to 9%.
