= El Puente (TV series) =

- TV series poster
- Genre: Reality television
- Presented by: Paula Vázquez
- Country of origin: Spain
- Original language: Spanish
- No. of seasons: 2
- No. of episodes: 16

Production
- Running time: 50 minutes
- Production company: Zeppelin TV

Original release
- Network: #0
- Release: 29 May 2017 – 23 September 2018

El Puente (The Bridge) is a Spanish reality television series in which a group of contestants is challenged to work together as a team in order to build a bridge.

Created and produced by Zeppelin TV (part of Endemol Shine Iberia), the first season aired on #0 from 29 May 2017 to 17 July 2017. It was filmed in the Argentinian Patagonia. The series was renewed for a second season, which was filmed in Vietnam, and all of its episodes were made available on VOD on 23 September 2018. The series was hosted by Paula Vázquez.

== Format ==
In the first season, a group of fifteen strangers was brought together and challenged to build a bridge to an island 300 meters away in 30 days. If they were successful, each contestant had to vote on who deserved to receive the €100,000 prize that was kept there. The person with the most votes had then to decide whether to keep it for themselves or share it among the group.

In the second season, two competing groups were introduced, among other twists. Each group consisted of seven people and had to build a bridge of 400 meters in 20 days.

== Series overview ==
List of seasons
Season	Premiere date	Finale date	Location	Prize	Winner
1	29 May 2017	17 July 2017	Patagonia, Argentina	€100,000	David
2	23 September 2018		Hạ Long Bay, Vietnam	€100,000	Equipo Sur (South Team)

== International adaptations ==
The French adaptation of the show, titled The Bridge : Le Trésor de Patagonie and hosted by Stéphane Rotenberg, premiered on M6 on 3 January 2019. A British adaptation, titled The Bridge and narrated by James McAvoy, was produced by Workerbee for Channel 4 in 2020. A Brazilian adaptation was produced for HBO Max in 2021.

An Australian version was commissioned for Paramount+ in 2022, with the first episode also broadcast on sister free-to-air channel Network 10 as a preview. Ten months later, the full series was broadcast on Network 10 in primetime, in the place of the premiere week of the 15th season of MasterChef Australia, which was delayed a week following the death of judge Jock Zonfrillo.

Country	Name	Broadcaster	Premiere	Finale	Host(s)	Winners
Australia	The Bridge Australia	Paramount+	19 August 2022	9 September 2022	Hugo Weaving (narrator)	Season 1, 2022: Bardie Somerville
Brazil	A Ponte: The Bridge Brasil	HBO Max	9 June 2022	23 June 2022	Murilo Rosa	Season 1, 2022: Suyane Moreira (Note: Received BRL 400 thousand, kept BRL 175 thousand and divided the remainder among the other participants.)
Denmark	The Bridge Danmark	Amazon Prime Video	4 November 2022	2 December 2022	Mads Steffensen	Season 1, 2022: TBC
Finland	The Bridge Suomi	Amazon Prime Video	4 November 2022	25 November 2022	Antti Reini	Season 1, 2022: Marju Kauppinen
France	The Bridge : Le Trésor de Patagonie	M6	3 January 2019	24 January 2019 (Note: Due to poor ratings, M6 cancelled airing episodes at 8:50 PM. Shows 3–5, which were initially to be aired on 17, 24, and 31 January were instead aired during the second part of the evening on 17 January and 24 January.)	Stéphane Rotenberg	Season 1, 2019: Elian Casini
Hungary	A híd	HBO Max	11 August 2023	25 August 2023	Magyarósi Csaba	Season 1, 2023: Janka Sára Molnár
Lithuania	Tiltas	Telia Play	Season 1: 4 October 2023; Season 2: 3 October 2024	Season 1: 6 December 2023; Season 2: 5 December 2024	Rytis Zemkauskas (narrator)	Season 1, 2023: Ignas Jomantas; Season 2, 2024: Algimantas Žadeikis
Norway	The Bridge	Amazon Prime Video	4 November 2022	9 December 2022	Jakob Oftebro	Season 1, 2022: Thomas Klungland Stange
South Africa	Die Brug	kykNET	Season 1: 26 October 2023; Season 2: 8 May 2025	Season 2: 4 January 2024; Season 2: 31 July 2025	Neil Sandilands (narrator)	Season 1, 2023-24: Robert Kruger; Season 2, 2025: Hirome Shigeaki
Sweden	The Bridge	Amazon Prime Video	4 November 2022	27 November 2022	Jens Hultén	Season 1, 2022: Robert Vrabac
United Kingdom	The Bridge (1); The Bridge: Race to a Fortune (2)	Channel 4	11 October 2020	29 June 2022	James McAvoy (2020) (narrator); AJ Odudu (2022); Aldo Kane (2022)	Series 1, 2020: Julie Nguyen (Note: Gave half the money to fellow contestant Sly); Series 2, 2022: Kim Blackman (Note: Gave half the money to Shaun Pelayo)
