= Société Internationale de Chirurgie Orthopédique et de Traumatologie =

International Society of Orthopaedics

SICOT
- Société Internationale de Chirurgie Orthopédique et de Traumatologie
- Abbreviation: S.I.C.O.T.
- Formation: 1929; 97 years ago
- Founded at: Paris, France
- Type: Nonprofit organization
- Headquarters: Brussels, Belgium
- Members: 2094 (November 2026)
- Official language: English
- Secretary General: Emmanuel Audenaert
- President: Hatem Galal Said
- President Elect: In-Ho Jeon
- Website: www.sicot.org

The Société Internationale de Chirurgie Orthopédique et de Traumatologie (SICOT) is an international non-profit organization in the field of orthopaedics and traumatology.

== History ==
The foundations of the Society were laid during its first Congress in Paris at the Hotel Crillon on October 10, 1929.

The group of founders who attended included: from Austria, Erlacher and Spitzy; from Belgium, Lorthioir, Delchef and Maffei; from Spain, San Ricart; from the United States, Albee, Baer and Meyerding; from France, Ombrédanne, Rocher, Sorrel and Nové-Josserand; from Great Britain, Fairbank; from Germany, Bielsalski; from Italy, Galeazzi and Putti; from Holland, Murk Jansen; from Romania, Frans Jiano; from Sweden, Haglund and Waldenström; from Switzerland, Machard; and from Czechoslovakia, Zahradníček.

=== Presidents of SICOT ===
1929-1930	Sir Robert Jones (United Kingdom)
1930-1933	Willem Murk-Jansen (Netherlands)
1933-1948	Louis Ombredanne (France)
1948-1954	Sir Harry Platt (United Kingdom)
1954-1960	Jean J. Delchef (Belgium)
1960-1963	Bryan McFarland (United Kingdom)
1963-1966	Matthias Hackenroch (Germany)
1966-1969	Sten Friberg (Sweden)
1969-1972	Robert Merle d’Aubigné (France)
1972-1975	Floyd Jergesen (United States)
1975-1978	Calogero Casuccio (Italy)
1978-1981	Keti T. Dholakia (India)
1981-1984	Maurice E. Müller (Switzerland)
1984-1987	Robert de Marneffe (Belgium)
1987-1990	Sir Dennis Paterson (Australia)
1990-1993	Leonardo Zamudio (Mexico)
1993-1996	Takao Yamamuro (Japan)
1996-1999	Charles Sorbie (Canada)
1999-2002	Rainer I.P. Kotz (Austria)
2002-2005	John C.Y. Leong (Hong Kong)
2005-2008	Chadwick F. Smith (United States)
2008-2011	Cody Bünger (Denmark)
2011-2014	Maurice Hinsenkamp (Belgium)
2014-2016	Keith Luk (Hong Kong)
2016-2018	Shanmuganathan Rajasekaran (India)
2018-2020	John Dormans (United States)
2020-2022	Ashok Johari (India)
2022-2024	Philippe Hernigou (France)
2024-2026	Vikas Khanduja (United Kingdom)
2026-2028	Hatem Galal Said (Egypt)

== Educational activities ==
SICOT organises a range of educational activities aimed at orthopaedic surgeons and trainees worldwide, including webinars, a face-to-face and online Diploma Examinations, virtual learning programmes and fellowships, and cadaver courses. The SICOT Diploma Examination is designed to assess core knowledge in trauma and orthopaedics against an international standard.

=== PIONEER ===
In 2020 the organisation launched the Programme of Innovative Orthopaedic Networking, e-Learning, Education and Research (PIONEER), a digital platform that offers live webinars, an online video archive and other virtual learning formats. Under the PIONEER umbrella, SICOT has developed structured virtual education, training and fellowship initiatives that combine online modules with opportunities for supervised clinical or surgical experience.

== Publications ==
SICOT also supports education through its scientific journals, including International Orthopaedics and the open access journal SICOT-J, as well as textbooks and training manuals for orthopaedic trainees.

=== International Orthopaedics ===
International Orthopaedics is an official journal of SICOT. The Journal is published monthly by Springer Verlag, and is distributed to 50,000 surgeons in electronic format and in 3,200 printed issues for libraries and special subscribers. It has an impact factor of 2.7 (2022).

=== SICOT-J ===
SICOT-J is an official journal of SICOT founded in 2014. It is a peer-reviewed open access journal. Its focus is on clinical, basic and transnational research in the field of orthopaedics surgery and traumatology.

=== Books ===
- Current Progress in Orthopedics 1: An Educational Initiative of SICOT
- Current Progress in Orthopedics 2
- Gopalan's Evidence Based Orthopaedic Principles - A SICOT India Initiative
- Early Onset Scoliosis
