= Rytis Rimdeika =

Lithuanian doctor and professor

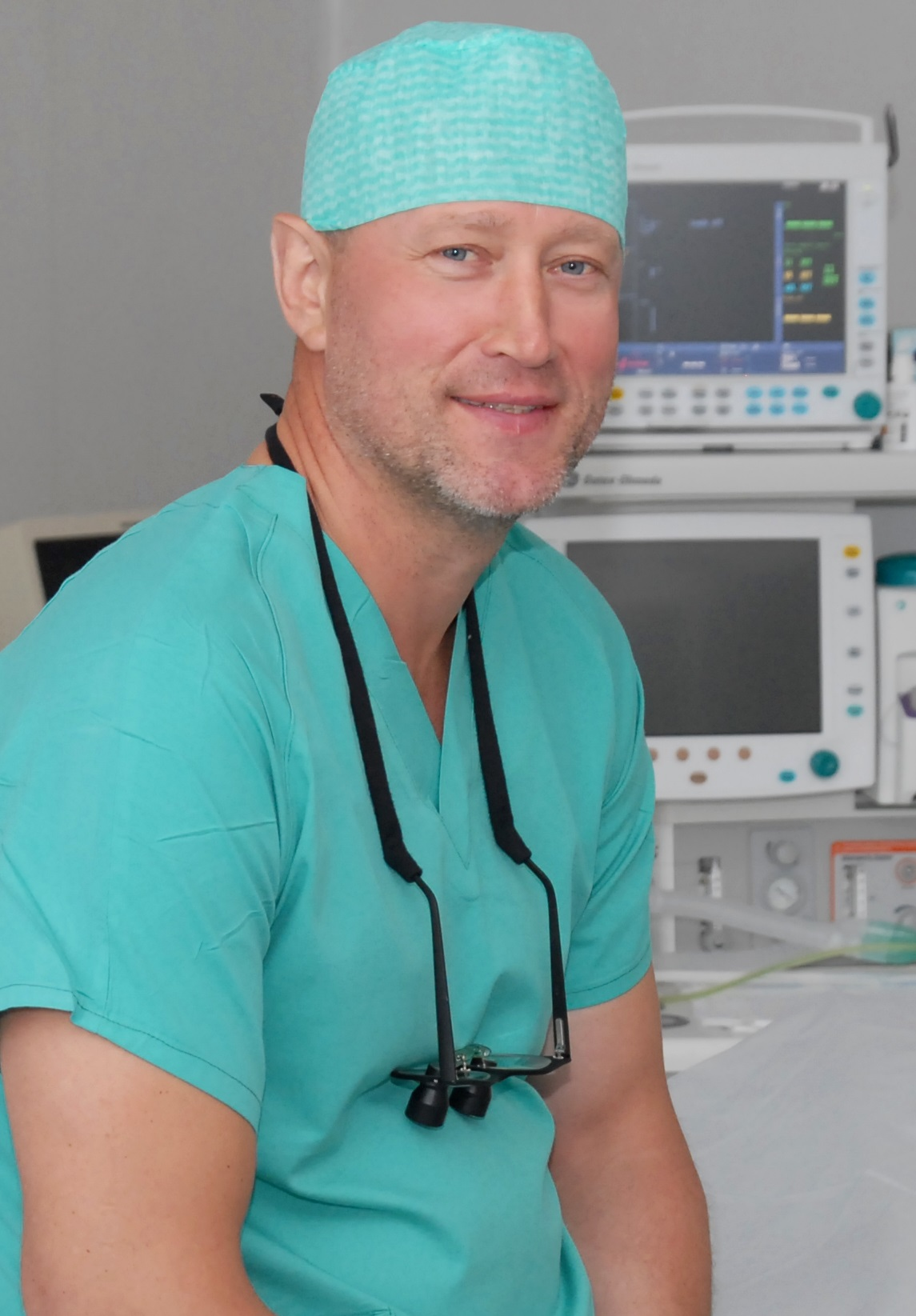
- Education: Kaunas Medical Academy
- Medical career
- Institutions: Lithuanian University of Health Sciences
- Sub-specialties: plastic surgery

Rytis Rimdeika (born 2 May 1966) is a Lithuanian medical doctor, scientist and professor. He was the Head of Department of Plastic and Reconstructive Surgery, Lithuanian University of Health Sciences, from 2006 to 2021.

== Biography ==
He studied at the former Kaunas Medical Academy, which has since merged into the Lithuanian University of Health Sciences, graduating in 1990. He then became a plastic and reconstructive surgeon in the academy's hospital.

From 1995 to 1999 he continued with his PhD studies in Kaunas University of Medicine's surgical department. In 1999, he defended his thesis, Chirurginių metodų veiksmingumas gydant riboto ploto gilius nudegimus.

From 2001 to 2006, he was head of the plastic surgery and burns department in Kaunas University of Medicine hospital.

Rimdeika began his academic career as an assistant lecturer in Kaunas University of Medicine in 1995, becoming lecturer in 1999 and associate professor in 2002. He became professor in 2006 and was also named Head of the Department of Plastic and Reconstructive Surgery in that year.

From 2016 to 2020, he was President of the Lithuanian Plastic and Reconstructive Surgery Society.

== Work ==
Rimdeika developed many plastic surgical techniques, gathered a group of qualified doctors for his department, and has been a manager and consultant for PhD candidates and post-doctoral scientists.

He was also a research scientist, who led medical studies related to reconstructive surgery and wounds and participated in many international projects and research projects. At international conferences, Rimdeika delivered over 300 lectures.

Rimdeika has been an editorial board member and reviewer of scientific journals such as Medicina, European Journal of Plastic and Reconstructive Surgery, Lietuvos Chirurgija, Novosti Khirurgi, and EWMA Journal.

== Memberships ==
European Society of Plastic, Reconstructive and Aesthetic Surgery (ESPRAS) member of the board, 2008–2018
European Wound Management Association (EWMA), member of the board, 2008–2014
President of the Lithuanian Society of Plastic and Reconstructive Surgery, 2016–2020
Representative of Lithuanian Society of Plastic and Reconstructive Surgery in many international events
President of the Lithuanian Wound Healing Association, 2005–2015
Member of European Burns Association (EBA)
Member of International Society of Burn Injuries (ISBI)

== Pupillage ==
Vishnevsky Institute of. Surgery (Russia)

Beverwijk Hospital and Euro Skin Bank (Netherlands)

Linköping University (Sweden)

Bochum University Hospital (Germany)

Vejle Hospital (Denmark)

Ghent University Hospital (Belgium) and many other medical centers.

== Other activities ==
From 2000–2014, he was a member of the board in Kaunas University of Medicine and member of the senate in Lithuanian University of Health Sciences. He also has been a member of numerous working groups in the Ministry of Health of the Republic of Lithuania. He has been adviser in health-related questions to the Mayor of Kaunas.

== Awards ==
- 1999 and 2015 was awarded honorary diplomas by the minister of Health in Lithuania.
- 2002 received "Gerumo plyta" ( "Gerumo kristalas“ ) award.
- 2006 received "Sveikatos riteris“ award in Kaunas.
- 2012 was awarded as an honoured doctor in Lithuania by the Ministry of Health of the Republic of Lithuania.
