= Gustilo open fracture classification =

Medical grading system for open fractures

The Gustilo open fracture classification system is the most commonly used classification system for open fractures. It was created by Ramón Gustilo and Anderson, and then further expanded by Gustilo, Mendoza, and Williams.

This system uses the amount of energy, the extent of soft-tissue injury and the extent of contamination for determination of fracture severity. Progression from grade 1 to 3C implies a higher degree of energy involved in the injury, higher soft tissue and bone damage and higher potential for complications. It is important to recognize that a Gustilo score of grade 3C implies vascular injury as well as bone and connective-tissue damage.

== Classification ==
Gustilo Open Fracture Classification (Medical Science)
Gustilo Grade	Definition
I	Open fracture, clean wound, wound <1 cm in length
II	Open fracture, wound > 1 cm but < 10 cm in length without extensive soft-tissue damage, flaps, avulsions
IIIA	Open fracture with adequate soft tissue coverage of a fractured bone despite extensive soft tissue laceration or flaps, or high-energy trauma (gunshot and farm injuries) regardless of the size of the wound
IIIB	Open fracture with extensive soft-tissue loss and periosteal stripping and bone damage. Usually associated with massive contamination. Will often need further soft-tissue coverage procedure (i.e. free or rotational flap)
IIIC	Open fracture associated with an arterial injury requiring repair, irrespective of degree of soft-tissue injury.

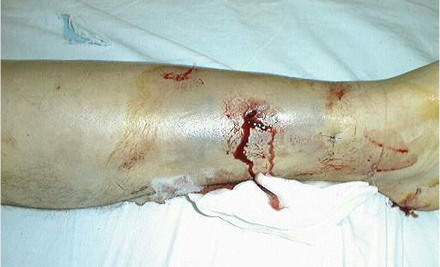
Gustilo type I open fracture

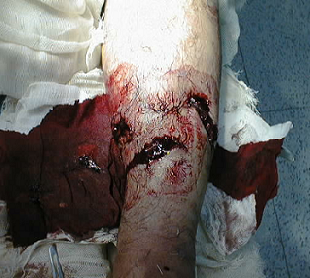
Gustilo type II open fracture

== Reliability ==
There are many discussions regarding the inter-observer reliability of this classification system. Different studies have shown inter-observer reliability of approximately 60% (ranging from 42% to 92%), representing poor-to-moderate agreement of scale grading between health-care professionals. This is due to much of the criteria being at risk of observer errors, and is a known liability of this scaling system. However, this classification is simple and hence easy to use, and is generally able to predict prognostic outcomes and guide treatment regimes. Generally, the higher the grading of Gustilo classification, the higher the rate of infection and complications; any Gustilo classification rating should still be interpreted with caution due to observer errors before any definite therapeutic plans are made.

Although this classification system has a fairly good ability to predict fracture outcomes, it is not perfect. The Gustilo classification does not take into account the viability and death of soft tissues over time which can affect the outcome of the injury. Besides, the number of the underlying medical illnesses of the patient also affects the outcome. Whether the timing of wound debridement, soft tissue coverage, and bone have any benefits on the outcome is also questionable. Besides, different types of bones have different rates of infection because they are covered by different amounts of soft tissues. Gustilo initially does not recommend early wound closure and early fixation for Grade III fractures. However, newer studies have shown that early wound closure and early fixation reduces infection rates, promotes fracture healing and early restoration of function. Therefore, assessment of all open fractures should include the mechanism of injury, the appearance of soft tissues, the likely levels of bacterial contamination and the specific characteristics of the fractures. Accurate assessment of the fracture can only be performed inside an operating theatre.

For more comprehensive prognosis purposes other classification systems, such as the Sickness Impact Profile (as a health status measure), Mangled Extremity Severity Score (MESS) and Limb Salvage Index (LSI) (decision to amputate or salvage a limb), have been devised by Dr Shanmuganathan Rajasekaran.

== History ==
In 1976, Gustilo and Anderson refined the early classification system proposed by Veliskasis in 1959. An early study conducted by Gustilo in 1976 showed that primary closures with prophylactic antibiotics of Type I and type II fractures reduced the risk of infection by 84.4%. Meanwhile, early internal fixation and primary closure of the wound in Type III fractures have a greater risk of getting osteomyelitis. However, Type III fractures occur in 60% of all the open fracture cases. Infection of the Type III fractures is observed in 10% to 50% of the time. Therefore, in 1984, Gustilo subclassified Type III fractures into A, B, and C with the aim of guiding the treatment of open fractures, communication and research, and to predict outcomes. Based on the results of the previous studies, Gustilo initially recommended therapeutic irrigation and surgical debridement for all fractures with primary closure for Type I and II fractures; secondary closure without internal fixation for Type III fractures. However, soon after that, he recommended internal fixation devices for Type III fractures.

== See also ==
- Tscherne classification
