= International Red Cross Wound Classification System =

Aspect of medicine

- Purpose: certain features of a wound are scored

The International Red Cross wound classification system is a system whereby certain features of a wound are scored: the size of the skin wound(s); whether there is a cavity, fracture or vital structure injured; the presence or absence of metallic foreign bodies. A numerical value is given to each feature (E, X, C, F, V, and M). The scores can later be graded according to severity and typed according to the structures injured.

This scoring system is intended for quick and easy use in the field.

Wounds are scored after surgery or initial assessment.

- E = (Entry) centimetres. Estimate the maximum diameter of the entry.
- X = (eXit) centimetres. Estimate the maximum diameter of the exit (X = 0 if no exit).
- C = (Cavity) Can the "cavity" of the wound take 2 fingers before surgery? No: C=0, Yes: C=1.

This may be obvious before operation or only established after skin incision. For chest and abdominal wounds it refers to the wound of the chest or abdominal wall.

- F = (Fracture) No fracture: F=0. Simple fracture, hole or insignificant comminution: F=1. Clinically significant comminution: F=2.
- V = (Vital structure) Are brain, viscera (breach of dura, pleura or peritoneum) or major vessels injured? No: V=0. Yes: V=1.
- M = (Metallic body) Bullet or fragments visible on X-ray. None: M=0. One metallic body: M=1. Multiple metallic bodies: M=2.

The wound classification system has been criticised on the basis that "it fails to account for the synergistic effect of combined arms employment on the battlefield. It erroneously assumes that each soldier will be injured or killed by only one type of weapon."

The classification is typically found on hospital Trauma History and Examination Record forms and is used for classification of penetrating injuries on presenting patients.
