= Louis Ombrédanne =

French pediatric and plastic surgeon (1871–1956)

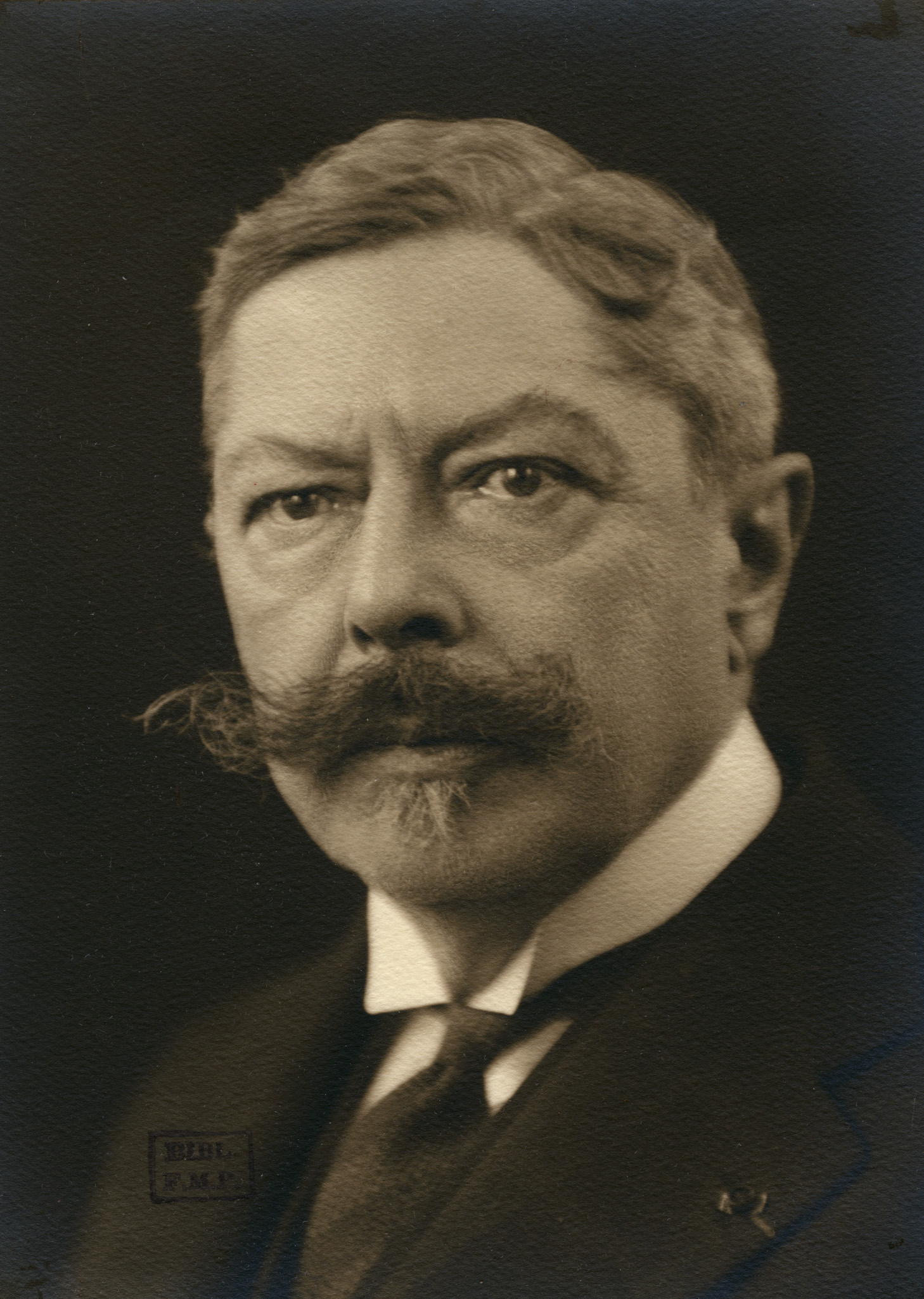
Louis Ombrédanne

Louis Ombrédanne (5 March 1871 – 4 November 1956) was a French pediatric and plastic surgeon born in Paris. He was the son of general practitioner Emile Ombrédanne.

In 1902 he became surgeon to Parisian hospitals, becoming a professor of surgery in 1907. From 1921 to 1940 he was head of pediatric surgery at the Hôpital Necker.

Ombrédanne's primary field of research was development of new methods of surgery. In 1906 he was the first to describe the use of the pectoralis minor muscle for breast reconstruction following mastectomy. He also introduced transscrotal orchiopexy for surgical repair of an undescended testis.

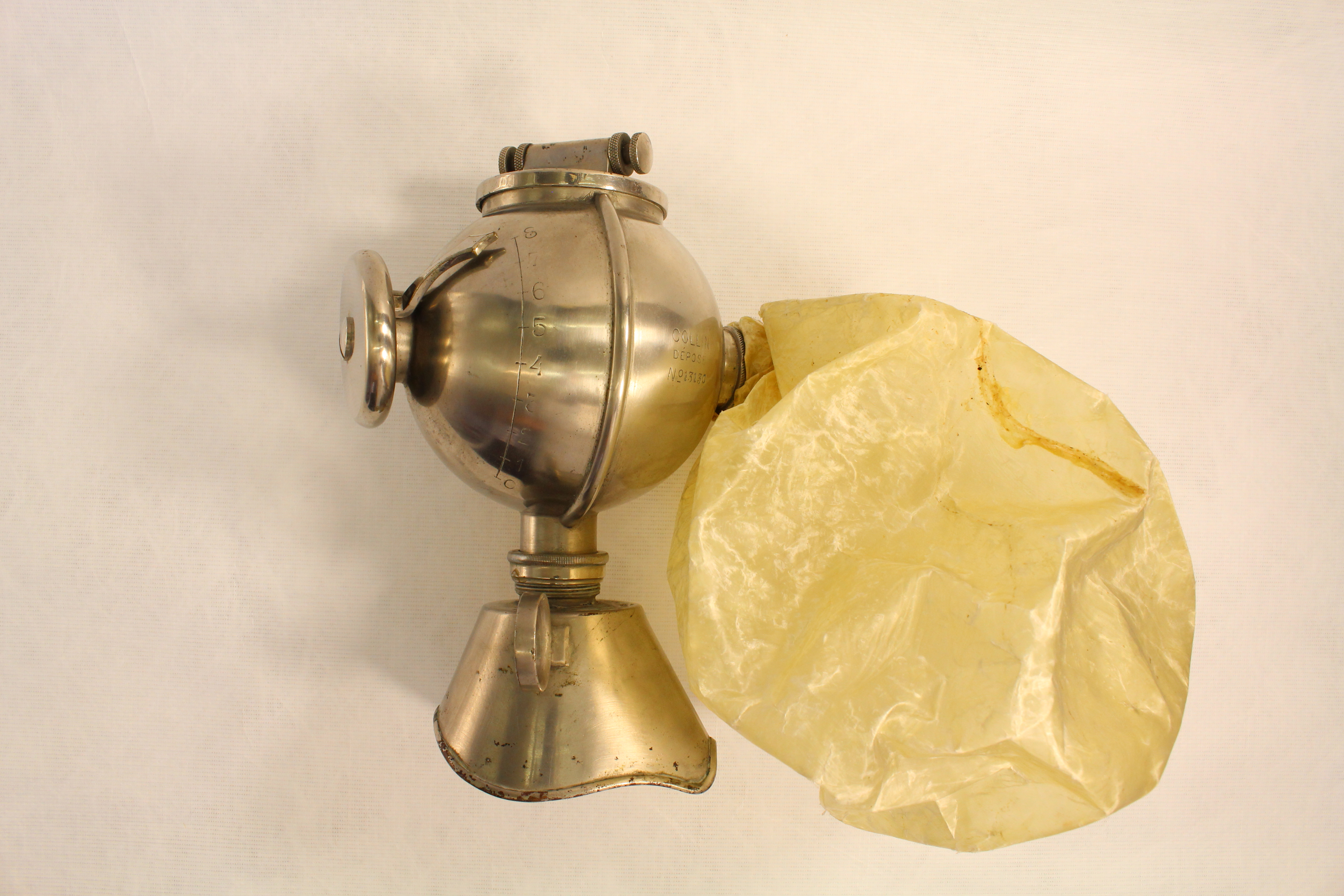
Ombrédanne's anesthesia mask; Musée des Hospices civils de Lyon.

In 1907, after two fatal anesthetic accidents, Ombrédanne created a prototype of an inhaler as a safe anesthetic device. It consisted of a tin container as reservoir that was fitted with felt to absorb ether, a graduated air inlet, and a respiratory reserve chamber. This device was tested successfully on over 300 patients, and design modifications were later made.

In 1929 Ombrédanne provided an early description of malignant hyperthermia, a condition he described as pallor with hyperthermia in newborns during anesthesia. The disorder is historically referred to as "Ombrédanne syndrome".
