= Shanmuganathan Rajasekaran =

Indian Orthopedic Spine Surgeon

- Born: 30 June 1958 (age 67); Magudanchavadi, Salem, Tamil Nadu
- Other names: Prof. Rajasekeran
- Education: M.B.B.S, PhD, FRCS, and MCh
- Alma mater: Coimbatore Medical College, Madras Medical College, University of Liverpool, Tamil Nadu Dr. M.G.R. Medical University, Royal College of Surgeons of England
- Occupation: Spine Surgeon

Shanmuganathan Rajasekaran (S. Rajasekaran) is an Indian Orthopedic Spine Surgeon. He is known for his work in spine tuberculosis, spine deformity corrections, and disc research.

He is the chairman of the department of orthopaedics & trauma and spine surgery division of Ganga Medical Centre and Hospitals, Coimbatore.

Rajasekaran was the Hunterian Professor and Honorary Fellow of the Royal College of Surgeons of England.

== Professional Leadership ==
Rajasekeran was the past international chair of AO Spine, past chair of the international research commission of AO spine, Cervical Spine Research Society (CSRS) and the immediate past president of Asia Pacific Spine Society. and former president of SICOT. Nationally, he has been the past president of Indian Orthopaedic Association and the Association of spine surgeons of India

== Early life and education ==
Shanmuganathan Rajasekaran was born on 30 June 1958. He completed studies at Coimbatore Medical College. He completed a Master of Surgery at the University of Liverpool in 1990. He received a PhD at Tamil Nadu Dr. M.G.R. Medical University in 2000. He was made a fellow at the Royal College of Surgeons, London in 2009.

== Institution building ==
After returning from England, Rajasekeran with his brother Dr S Raja Sabapathy started specialty center for orthopaedics and plastic surgery in 1991 at Ganga medical Centre and hospitals, Coimbatore. With 650 beds and 40 operating theatres, the hospital caters to more than 30,000 major surgeries every year.

Rajasekaran established the Ganga Spine Injury and Rehabilitation Center (GSIRC) for paralysed patients, where more than 1850 paralysed patients have been rehabilitated at a subsidized cost.

He also established Ganga Orthopaedic Research & Education Foundation’ (GOREF) was established in August 2002 under his guidance to facilitate and conduct research in all aspects of orthopaedic surgery, in both clinical and basic sciences.

Rajasekaran is the visiting professor of Harvard Medical International, Boston, USA. He was the Grand Rounds Lecturer of Mayo Hospital, USA in 2010.

Rajasekaran is the deputy editor of The Journal of Bone and Joint Surgery, Spine, and Global Spine Journal

He has an H-index of 49 with research citations counting 11,756, a research interest score of 6,258 as of 2024.

== Philanthropy ==
Rajasekeran has powered many philanthropic and corporate social responsibility projects

=== Project SWASAM ===
In 2018, Shanmuganthan Rajasekeran founded Project SWASAM that means 'Breath of Life'. It was inaugurated by Former president Dr APJ Abdul Kalam on 3rd May 2018. It has many sub projects which have created a huge impact for the Society.

=== Project Helpline ===
Free corrective surgeries for limb deformities of whatever etiology for children from poor socio-economic status.

=== UYIR ===
In June 2018, Rajasekaran founded a charitable trust UYIR (Meaning Life), a ‘People’s Movement for Road Safety’. It was inaugurated by Chief Minister M. K. Stalin. The project has also implemented a special program called 'Kutty Cops', which has trained approximately 425,000 children to act as responsible individuals at home. These children ensure that adults do not use their mobile phones while driving, obey traffic signals, avoid speeding, wear helmets, and fasten their seat belts.

One of the significant achievements in the realm of road safety was the Public Interest Litigation on the Union Government of India in the Supreme Court (Rajasekaran Vs Union Govt of India- Writ Petition (Civil) No.295 of 2012). This is a groundbreaking intervention and order by the Supreme Court on road safety to date.

== Awards ==
- Sir JC Bose Lifetime Achievement Award 2023
- ISSLS Best Paper Award for Basic Science, 2023
- North American Spine Society Outstanding Research Award consecutively for three years 2019, 2020 and 2021

== Notable publications ==
- "AOSpine Masters Series: Spinal Infections", 10 Books, June 15, 2018, Volume 10, ASIN:B0CDNXV28T, 445 pages; Shanmuganathan Rajasekaran (Author), Ziya L. Gokaslan (Author), Charles G. Fisher (Author), Luiz Roberto Gomes Vialle (Author), Stefano Boriani (Author), Manabu Ito (Author), K. Daniel Riew (Author), Lawrence G Lenke (Author), Carlo Bellabarba (Author), Frank Kandziora (Author)
- "Comparison of imageless robotic assisted total knee arthroplasty and conventional total knee arthroplasty: early clinical and radiological outcomes of 200 knees"; 2024; Vol: 18; Shanmuganathan Rajasekaran 1, Dhanasekaran Soundarrajan 2, Rithika Singh 2, Bahru Atnafu Shiferaw 2, Raja Bhaskara Rajasekaran 2, Palanisami Dhanasekararaja 2, Natesan Rajkumar 2
- "Bacteria in human lumbar discs – subclinical infection or contamination? Metabolomic evidence for colonization, multiplication, and cell-cell cross-talk of bacteria"; 2023, Vol: 23, Shanmuganathan Rajasekaran, Chitraa Tangavel, Gowdaman Vasudevan, Murugesh Easwaran
