= Tscherne classification =

Soft tissue injury classification system

The Tscherne classification is a system of categorization of soft tissue injuries.

== Classification ==
Tscherne Grade	Open soft tissue injuries	Closed fractures
0		Fr. C 0 - No or minor soft-tissue injury from a simple fracture due to indirect trauma
I	Fr. O 1 - Skin lacerated by bone fragment. No or minimal contusion to the skin	Fr. C 1 - Superficial contusion or abrasion to the skin
II	Fr. O 2 - Skin laceration with circumferential skin or soft-tissue contusion and moderate contamination	Fr. C 2 - Deep contaminated abrasions with skin or muscle contusion from direct trauma
III	Fr. O 3 - Extensive soft-tissue damage with major vessel or nerve injury	Fr. C 3 - Extensive skin contusion with destruction of subcutaneous tissue avulsion or muscle destruction
IV	Fr. O 4 - Subtotal and total amputations with separation of all important anatomical structures	

== Reliability ==
The intraobserver (observations at two different times by the same person) agreement for Tscherne classification is 85%; while for inter-observer agreement is 65%.

== History ==
This classification system was developed by Harald Tscherne and Hans-Jörg Oestern in 1982 at the Hannover Medical School (Hanover, Germany) to classify both open and closed fractures. This classification system is based on the physiological concept that the higher the kinetic energy imparted on the bone, the higher the kinetic energy imparted on the soft tissue. It also serves as a tool to guide management and to predict clinical outcomes. It also serves as a communication tool in research and in clinical presentations.

== See also ==
- Gustilo open fracture classification
