= European Wound Management Association =

The European Wound Management Association (EWMA) was founded in 1991. The association promotes the advancement of education and research into native epidemiology, pathology, diagnosis, prevention and management of wounds of all aetiologies.

EWMA is an umbrella organisation linking wound management associations across Europe and a multidisciplinary group bringing together individuals and organisations interested in wound management. Currently, the association bridges 54 Cooperating Organisations (national wound care associations in Europe) and, in addition, partners with a considerable number of wound and wound related associations in and outside of Europe. Similar organizations include the European Tissue Repair Society, the Tissue Viability Society, the World Union of Wound Healing Societies, and the Wound Care Society.

EWMA is an educational resource, organising conferences, contributing to international projects related to wound management, supporting the implementation of existing knowledge within wound management, and providing information on all aspects of wound management.

== Objectives ==
1. To promote the advancement of education and research into epidemiology, pathology, diagnosis, prevention and management of wounds of all aetiologies.
2. To arrange conferences on aspects of wound management throughout Europe.
3. To arrange multi-centre, multi-disciplinary training courses on topical aspects of wound healing.
4. To create a forum for networking for all individuals and organisations interested in wound management

== Journal of Wound Management ==
The Journal of Wound Management is the official journal of the European Wound Management Association (EWMA). Issues are published in January, May and October.

EWMA Journal is CINAHL indexed and provides peer-reviewed original scientific articles, reviews, clinical information, and information about development in wound healing and management across Europe. The Journal also functions as a communication tool between EWMA, its members and the EWMA cooperating Organisations. The Journal is freely available online under terms of the Creative Commons Attribution-NonCommercial 4.0 International (CC BY-NC 4.0) which means that anybody can copy, redistribute in any medium or format, adapt, remix, transform and make indicated changes with appropriate credit. It is prohibited to use the articles for commercial purposes.

It is distributed to EWMA members and to members of national wound healing organisations in Europe, as well as to a wider audience via the internet. As a result, each issue of the EWMA Journal is distributed to 12-13,000 nurses, doctors and other health care professionals who have a special interest in wound care.
