= Rytis Zemkauskas =

Lithuanian journalist, writer, broadcaster and film director

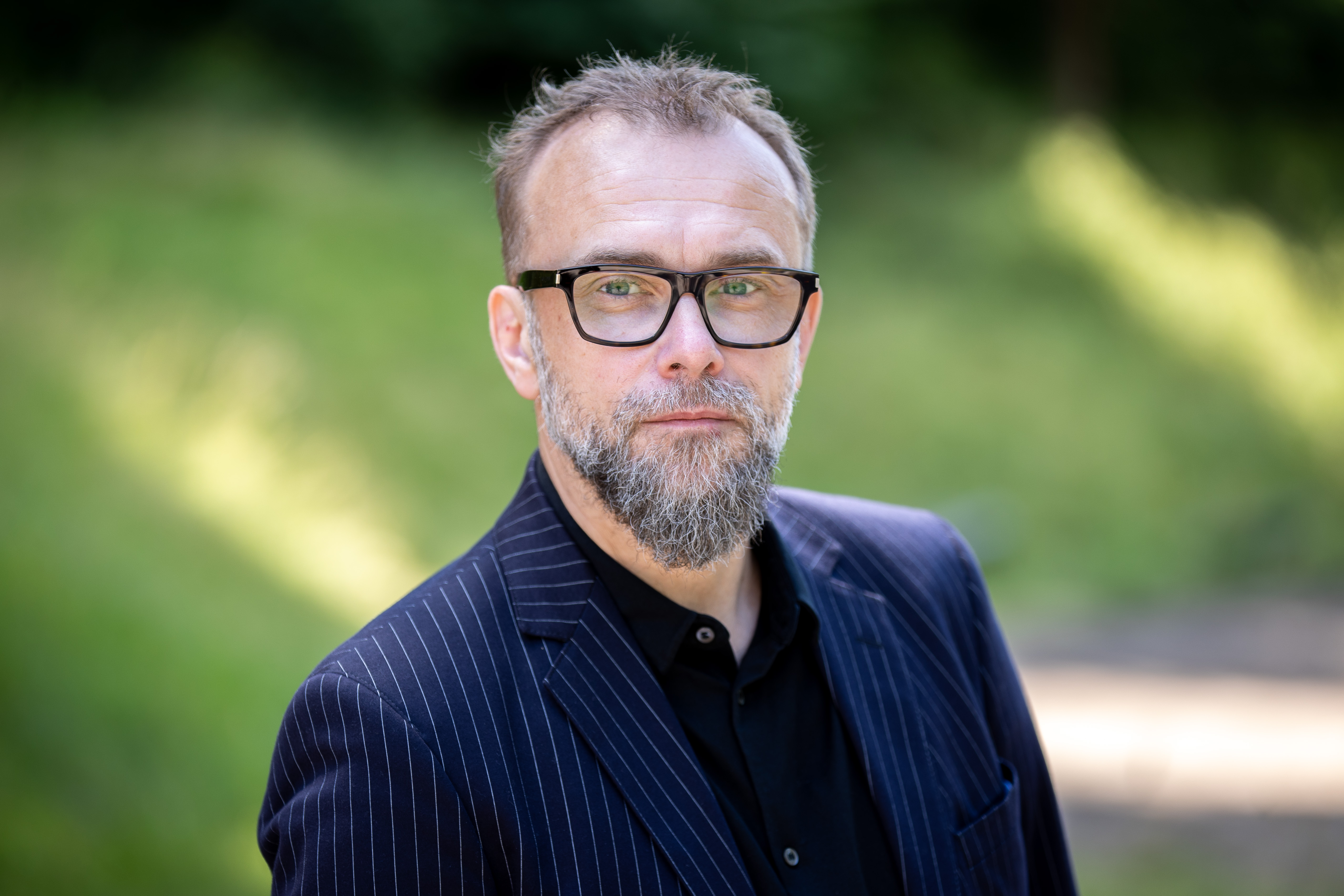
- Zemkauskas in 2023
- Born: October 28, 1969 (age 56); Kaunas, Lithuania
- Education: Vilnius University
- Occupations: journalist, writer, broadcaster and film director
- Known for: associated professor at Vytautas Magnus University of Kaunas

Rytis Zemkauskas (born October 28, 1969 in Kaunas, Lithuania) is a journalist, a writer, a broadcaster and a film director.

== Biography ==
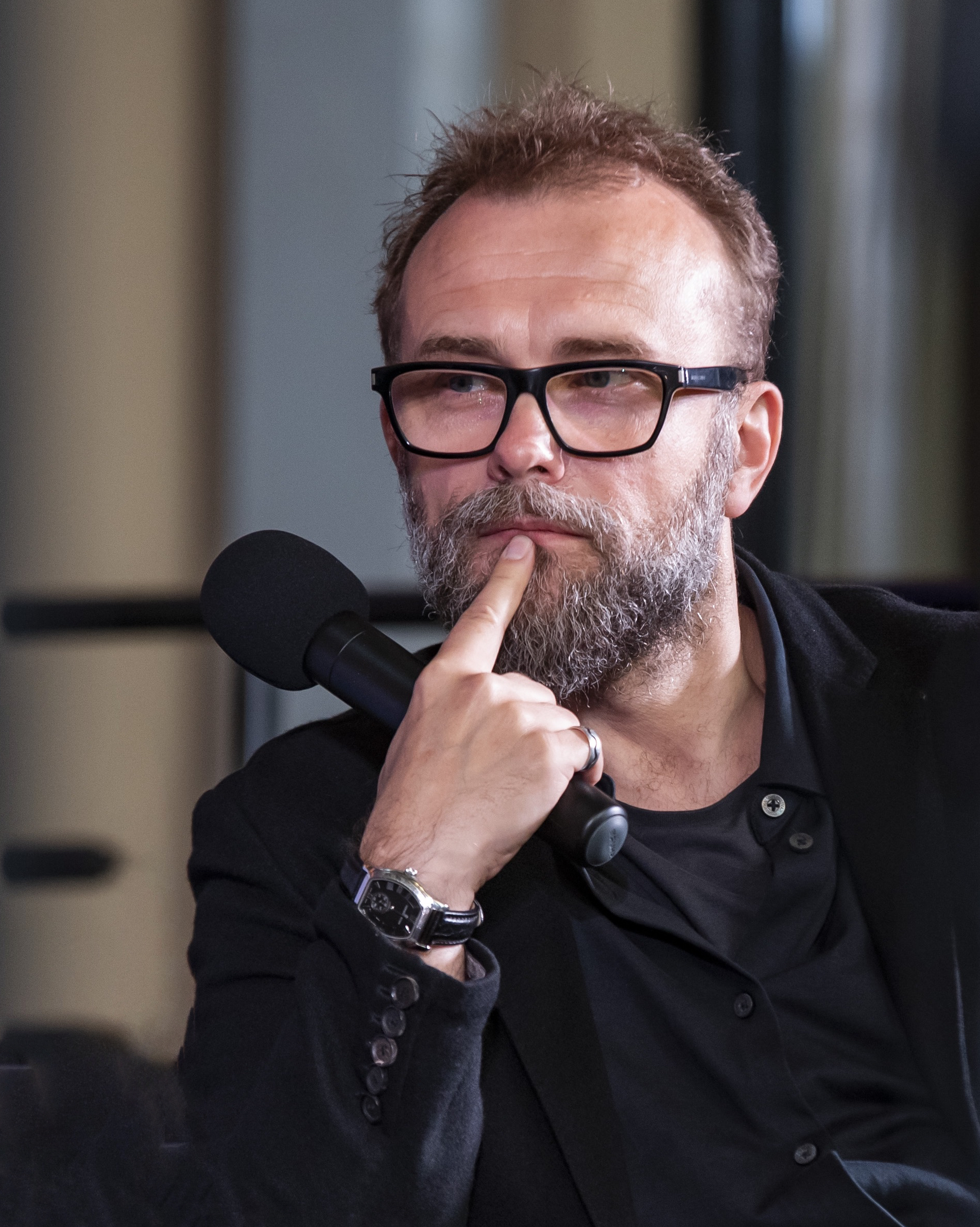
Zemkauskas in 2022

Graduated Vilnius University (field of linguistics, majored in comparative literature) in 1993. Since 1995 has initiated various cultural and educational TV projects as journalist, writer, presenter and producer. For his journalistic and producing work has been awarded numerous public and professional awards. Since 1998 he is active as writer and director of documentaries on music, literature and science, owns a small TV production company. Rytis Zemkauskas is an author of several books and columnist at “Intelligent Life” Lithuanian edition since 2009. Since 2016 he is an associated professor at Vytautas Magnus University of Kaunas (subjects: “The art of the interview” and “Narrative construction”). Since 2016 he is a member of curatorial board for Kaunas the European Capital of Culture 2022. His public activities also include lectures: “Social Network. Concept for a Modern Hybrid State” and “European Capital of Culture as a Role Model”.
