= Kirschner wire =

Pins used in orthopaedic surgery

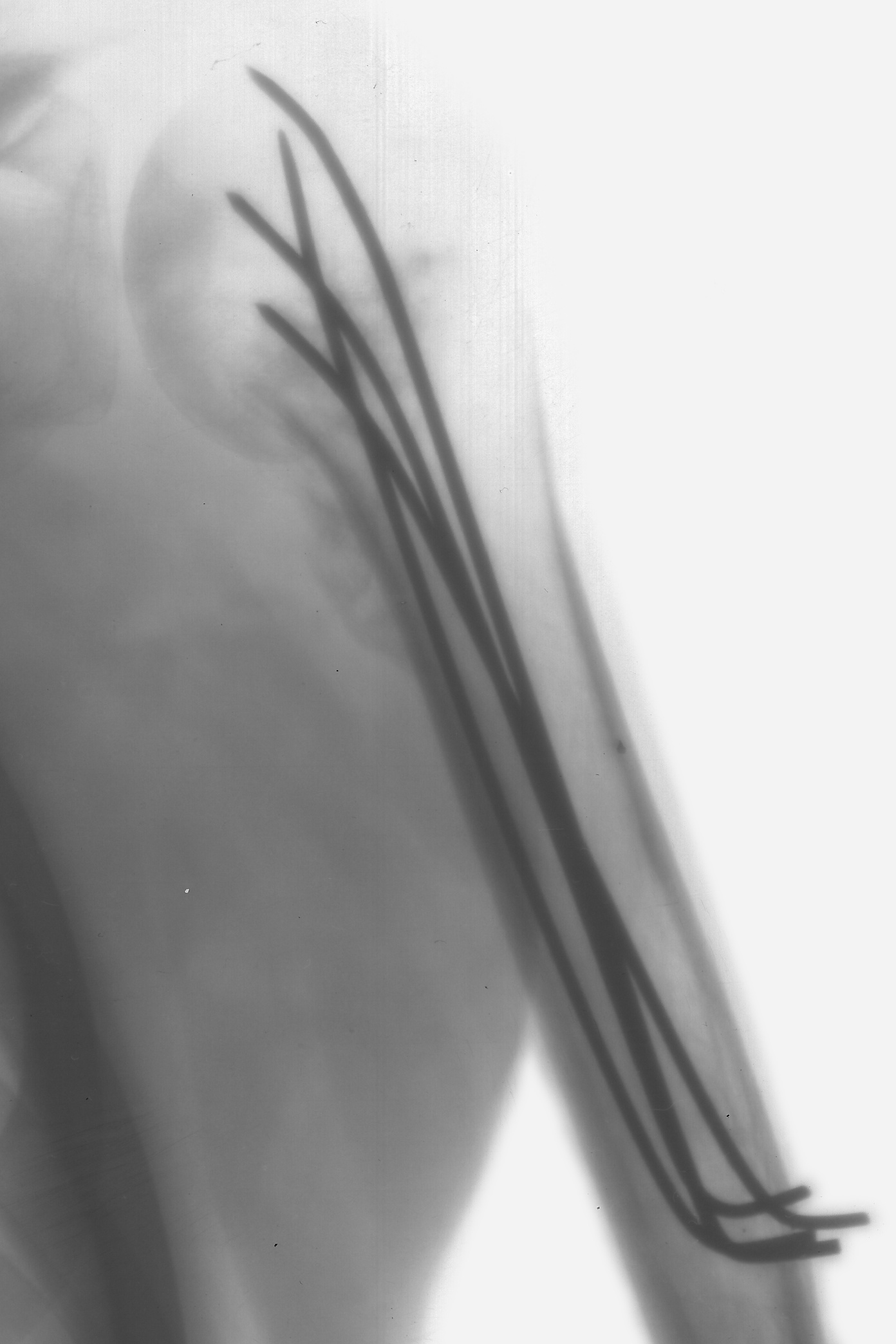
Intraoperative X-ray of a humerus fixated by Kirschner wires

Kirschner wires or K-wires or pins are sterilized, sharpened, smooth stainless steel pins. Introduced in 1909 by Martin Kirschner, the wires are now widely used in orthopedics and other types of medical and veterinary surgery. They come in different sizes and are used to hold bone fragments together (pin fixation) or to provide an anchor for skeletal traction. The pins are often driven into the bone through the skin (percutaneous pin fixation) using a power or hand drill. They also form part of the Ilizarov apparatus.

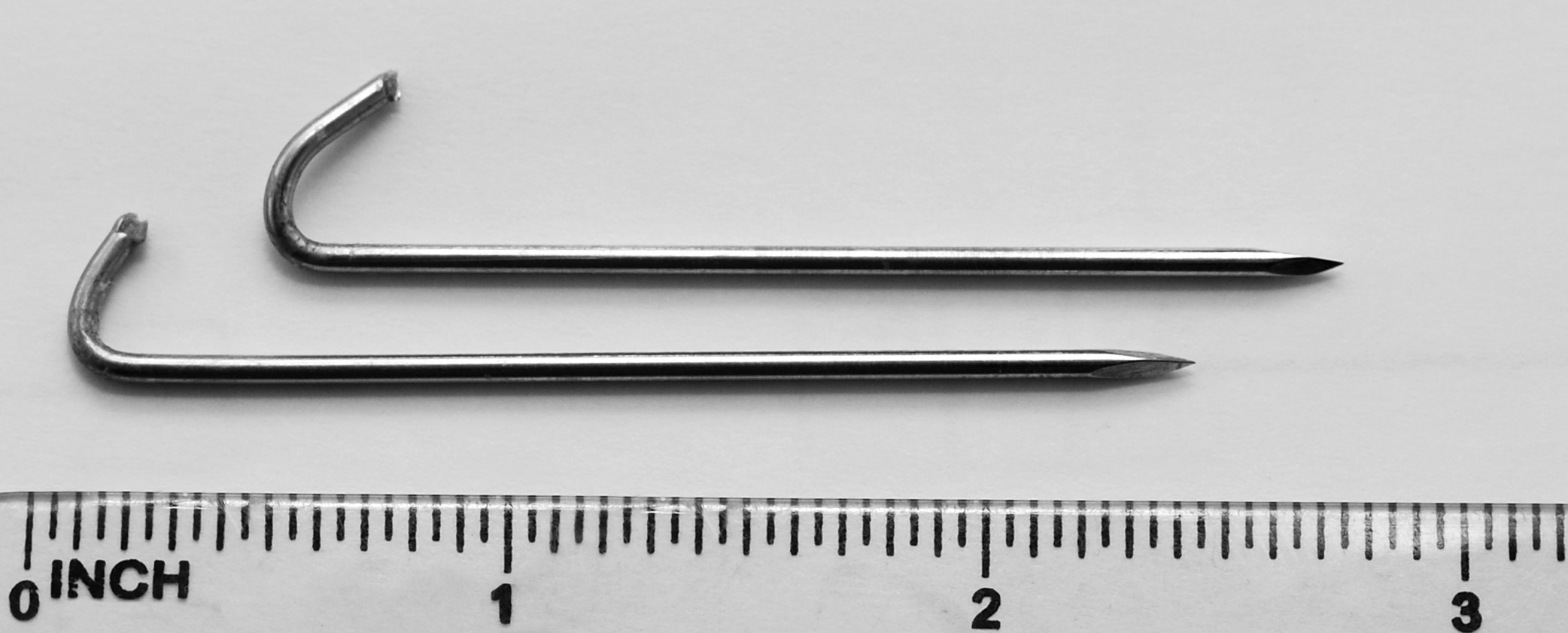
Kirschner wires used for fixation of a Colles' fracture

== Variations ==
- Threaded K-wires are available. Used in situations where backing out of the pin is undesirable, they are inherently weaker than smooth K-wires.
- "Denham Pins" are strong, stout wires with a threaded portion at the midpoint. They are used for skeletal traction, with the threads engaging the bone. This pin was invented in 1956 by the English orthopedic surgeon Robert Arthur Denham (born 1922).

== Indications ==
- K-wires are used for temporary fixation during some operations. After definitive fixation they are then removed. The pins are usually removed four weeks post operation.
- They can be used for definitive fixation if the fracture fragments are small (e.g. wrist fractures and hand injuries). In some settings they can be used for intramedullary fixation of bones such as the ulna.
- Tension band wiring is a technique in which the bone fragments are transfixed by K-wires which are then also used as an anchor for a loop of flexible wire. As the loop is tightened the bone fragments are compressed together. Fractures of the kneecap and the olecranon process of the elbow are commonly treated by this method.
- A wire is passed through the skin then transversely through the bone and out the other side of the limb. The wire is then attached to some form of traction so that the pull is applied directly to bone. In traction of the femur for example, the protruding ends of the wire are fixed to the legs of a horseshoe shaped frame which maintains tension in the wire while the crook of the horseshoe is attached via line and pulleys to weights which maintain the traction.
- They can be used for temporary joint immobilization.
- K-wires can be used to guide cannulated screws to a precise location.

== Complications ==
- Pin tract infection: Because K-wires often pass through the skin into bone they form a potential passage for bacteria from the skin to migrate into the bone and cause an infection. In such cases, the area around the pin becomes red and swollen and may start to drain pus. Usually this infection clears up after removal of the pin. The available evidence indicates that prophylactic antibiotics at the time of surgery do no reduce the risk of k-wire assocaited pin site infection.
- Breakage: K-wires may bend or break, especially if the fracture does not heal.
- Loss of fixation: Smooth K-wires may back out of the bone losing the fixation. This is especially likely if they pass between two mobile bones.
- Migration of K-wires can occur; instead of backing out the wire can move deeper. K-wires passed across the acromioclavicular (AC) joint in the shoulder have been found to migrate into the chest with the potential to penetrate the major blood vessels, the trachea, lung, or the heart.

For hand fracture fixation, whether K-wires should be buried or left protruding from the skin remains a topic of debate and ongoing research.

== See also ==
- Suzuki frame
- Cannulated bar
