= Rodney Stilwell =

American golfer (born 1957)

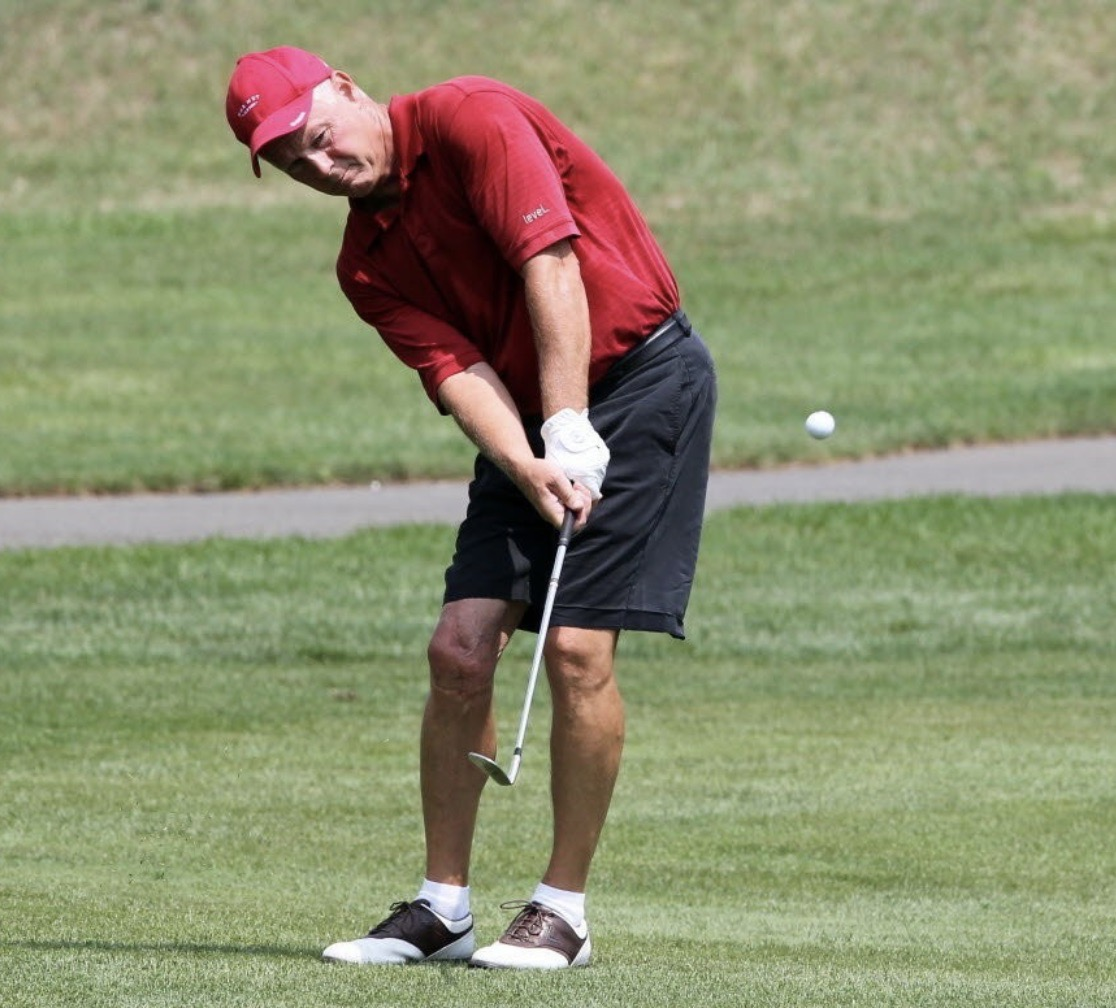
- Stilwell chips in for the Staten Island Slam
- Born: November 4, 1957 (age 68); Staten Island, New York, U.S.
- Education: Brooklyn Law School
- Occupation: Lawyer
- Known for: Elite Staten Island Amateur Golfer
- Height: 6 ft 2 in (188 cm)
- Spouse: Jane Sullivan (1985-present)
- Children: 4
- Awards: Iron Horse Award in 1975 Inducted into Staten Island Sports Hall of Fame in 2024

Rodney Stilwell (born November 4, 1957) is an American amateur golfer who has competed in the Staten Island Golf Association Championship, the Staten Island Amateur, the Staten Island Senior Amateur, the Steven F. Zuntag Staten Island Classic, the Steven F. Zuntag Staten Island Senior Classic, the New York City Amateur, the Metropolitan Amateur, the Ike MGA Stroke Play Championship, the MGA Public Links Championship, U.S. Amateur, U.S. Mid-Amateur, and the U.S. Senior Amateur.

Stilwell overcame significant adversity on his path to becoming one of Staten Island's elite golfers. At the age of eight, he was struck by a New York City bus while riding a bicycle, suffering severe injuries to his legs that cast doubt on his future in athletics. Despite this, he pursued golf with determination, eventually reaching a level of skill that might have led to a professional career had the accident not occurred.

Stilwell is admitted to practice law in the State and Federal Courts of New York and New Jersey, and before the Supreme Court of the United States.

Stilwell has actively serves his community through numerous leadership roles, including positions on the Staten Island YMCA Board, St. Vincent's Medical Center, the Alzheimer's Foundation, the Cancer Society, the Richmond County Bar Association Board, and the Brooklyn Law School Alumni Association Board, in addition to his role as an Officer of the Staten Island Golf Association.

== Early life ==
Stilwell was born in Staten Island, New York to Stanley and Anna Theresa (née Scamardella) Stilwell. His maternal grandparents, both originally from Italy—his grandfather from Bacoli—immigrated to the United States. His grandparents were funeral directors on Staten Island establishing Scamardella Funeral Home in 1927. His father was of Irish, English and Norwegian descent.

His parents were both teachers in the New York City Board of Education. His father, who was instrumental in establishing the football program at Susan E. Wagner High School, is honored annually at the football awards dinner with awarding the Mr. Stan Stillwell Memorial Award – Spartan. The family, which included brothers Stanley, Winslow, Dwight and Matthew and sisters Anne Marie and Tina, lived in a modest house on Grymes Hill near the city's Silver Lake golf course, where Stilwell and his brothers would sneak onto the course and practice their short game helping to develop his signature poise around and on the green in order to gain an advantage over the distance hitters. From 1972 to 1978, Stilwell served as a caddy at Richmond County Country Club on Staten Island learning the game with some of Staten Island's elite golfers. Stilwell admitted to being self-taught, never taking a lesson and never hiring a swing coach.

At the 1975 Iron Horse Award ceremony, Stilwell reflected "[m]y father played, and he encouraged me. I live right behind Wagner College, so I used to go on their field and hit nine irons and wedges." On August 4, 1978, his father Stan died of a heart attack at St. Vincent's Medical Center after being stricken while playing golf walking up the hill to approach the 6th green at Silver Lake Golf Course.

Stilwell attended Susan Wagner High School in Staten Island, New York and graduated in 1975. He graduated from Stony Brook University with a B.A. in Political Science in 1979. Following graduation, he attended and graduated from Brooklyn Law School in 1982 with a Juris Doctor.

== Severe and life-threatening childhood injury ==
When he was eight years old, Stilwell was hit by a New York City bus while riding a bicycle and got caught under its wheels. His legs were severely injured. Naturally, he wasn't expected to be able to play any athletics. During his hospitalization, Stilwell was visited by Curt Blefary, the American League's Rookie of the Year and autographed a baseball for Stilwell.

At the 1975 Iron Horse Awards Ceremony, Stilwell, visibly limping from his childhood injury, spoke with the press after receiving the esteemed Iron Horse Award. Reflecting on his past, he shared, “[b]ut in my freshman year, I bought a set of golf clubs from a kid. He gave me a pretty good deal, and they were good clubs, so I started playing a little at Silver Lake.”

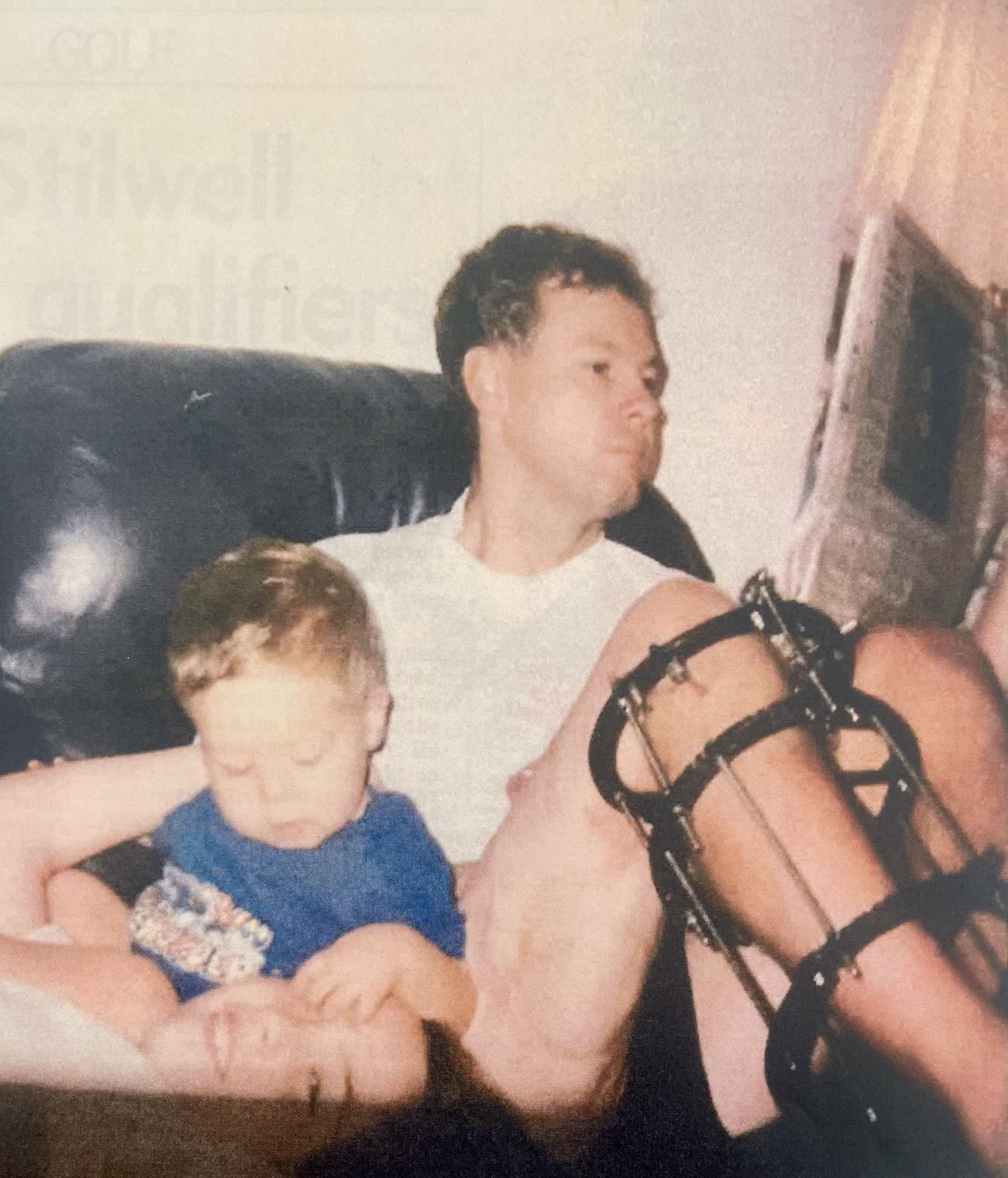
1995 Leg Reconstruction

In 1988, Stilwell retired from competitive golf due to debilitating pain in his right knee, stemming from a childhood bus injury. In 1995, he underwent a complex reconstructive surgery at the University of Maryland, performed by world-renowned orthopedic surgeon Dr. Dror Paley. The procedure involved breaking and realigning his tibia and fibia bones to redistribute the load on his knee. Due to the need for stability, an external fixation device, similar in concept to a halo, was applied to his lower leg to maintain bone alignment and reduce internal pressure during healing. Following an extensive recovery period and physical therapy, Stilwell made a return to competitive golf in 2002.

== Amateur career ==
In his senior year of high school, Stilwell was awarded the Iron Horse Award by the New York City Public School Athletic League ("PSAL") recognizing him as the best public high school golfer in the five boroughs of New York City. Stilwell bested Rich Jung of Madion High School and George Peknic of Bayside High School on the 18th hole at Split Rock Golf Course to win the Iron Horse, the symbol of supremacy among senior high school athlete golfers in the PSAL. In the fall of 1975, Stilwell headed for Stony Brook University, a school without a golf team.

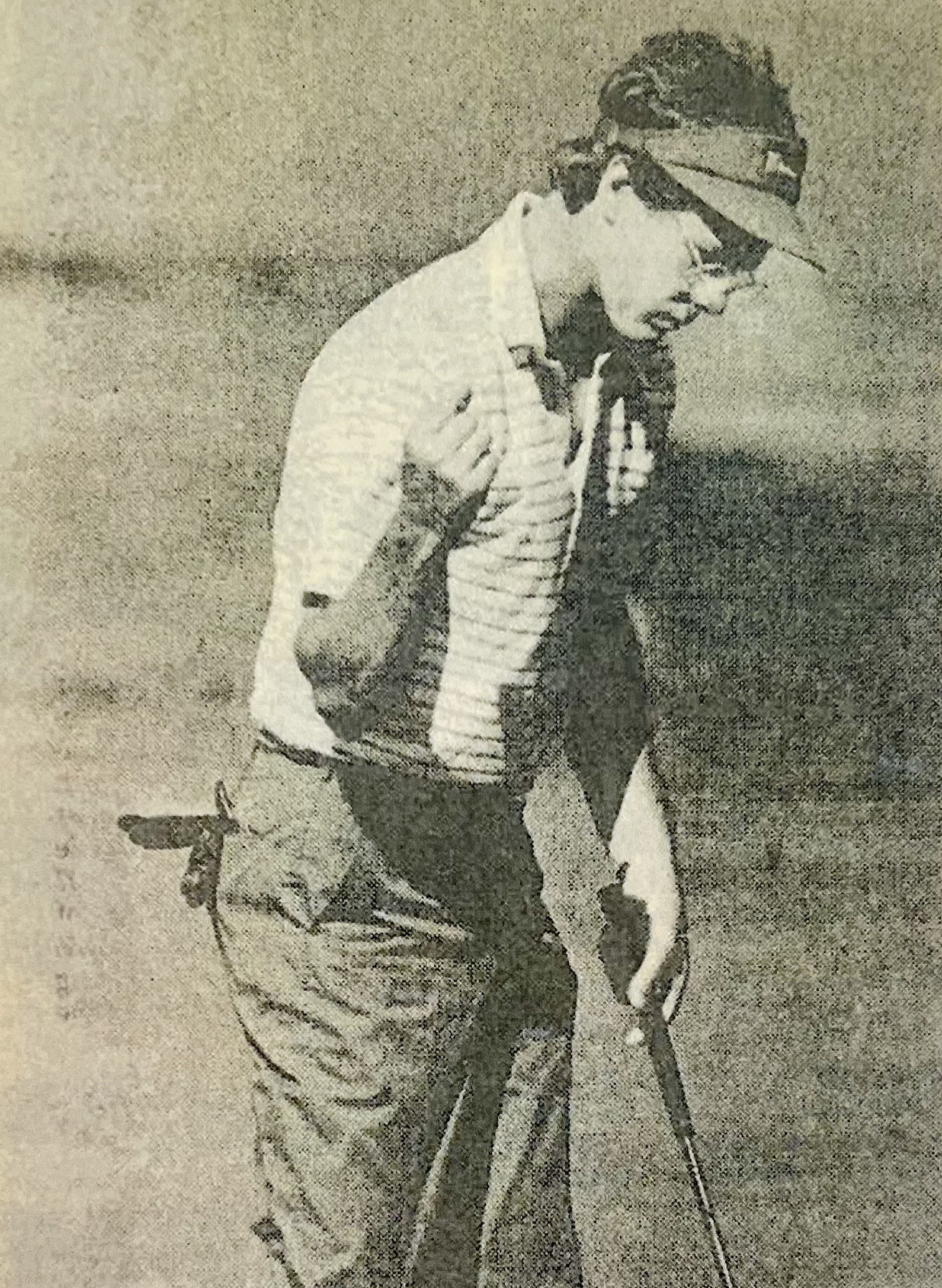
Stilwell Wins First Staten Island Classic

In 1984, Stilwell captured his first Staten Island Amateur Golf Championship scrambling through 33 holes of match play at Richmond County Country Club to dethrone the 1983 champion, Scott Ireland, in the final round. In 1986, Stilwell won his first Staten Island Classic Golf Championship by overcoming leader Pete Meuer in the final round. He shot a 1-under-par 71, securing a six-stroke victory over second-place finisher Bob Britton in the 54-hole tournament.

Stilwell took a hiatus from competitive golf, retiring from 1988 to 2002, due to family obligations and debilitating right knee pain stemming from a childhood bus accident that nearly claimed his life.

In 2002, he made a determined return to competitive golf, competing on a repaired and reconstructed right knee. Between 2002 and 2012, he won the Staten Island Classic twice, the Staten Island Amateur once, and claimed titles in both the Staten Island Senior Amateur and the Staten Island Senior Classic.

In 2013, Stilwell achieved a feat that no other golfer on Staten Island had ever accomplished, tecoming he first and only man to complete the eStaten Island Slam," capturing titles in the Staten Island Amateur, the Staten Island Classic, the Senior Amateur, and the Senior Classic—all in the same year.

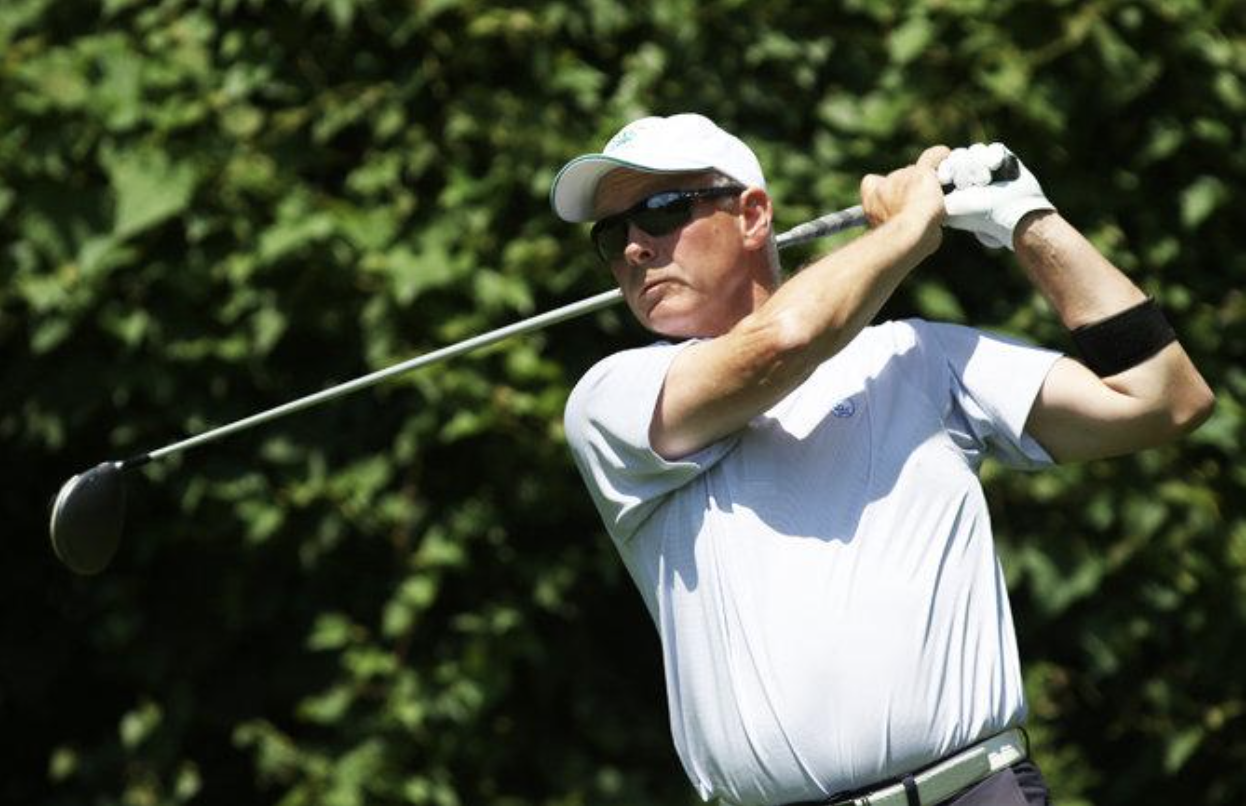
Stilwell Wins Fifth Staten Island Amateur

Stilwell went on to win the Staten Island Amateur two more times in 2016 and 2017, bringing his total to five victories in the tournament, tying him for second place in its history alongside Pete Meuer and just one win behind all-time leader Bob Britton. He also triumphed in the Staten Island Classic in 2022 and 2023, achieving a total of six wins in the Classic, second only to the all-time record held by Pete Meuer.

On July 28, 2024, Stilwell shot his age of 66 at Silver Lake Golf Course, finishing 4 under par.

Overall, Stilwell has amassed an impressive total of 28 amateur championships: 6 Staten Island Classics, 6 Staten Island Senior Classics, 5 Staten Island Amateurs, 5 Staten Island Senior Amateurs, 3 Staten Island Golf Association Championships, and 3 NYC Senior Amateur Championships.

== Induction into Staten Island Sports Hall of Fame ==
Stilwell has won all of Staten Island's major amateur golf tournaments, most of them multiple times, including 5 Staten Island Amateurs, 6 Staten Island Classics, and a combined 17 Senior Amateurs, Senior Classics, Staten Island Golf Association Championships, and NYC Amateurs.

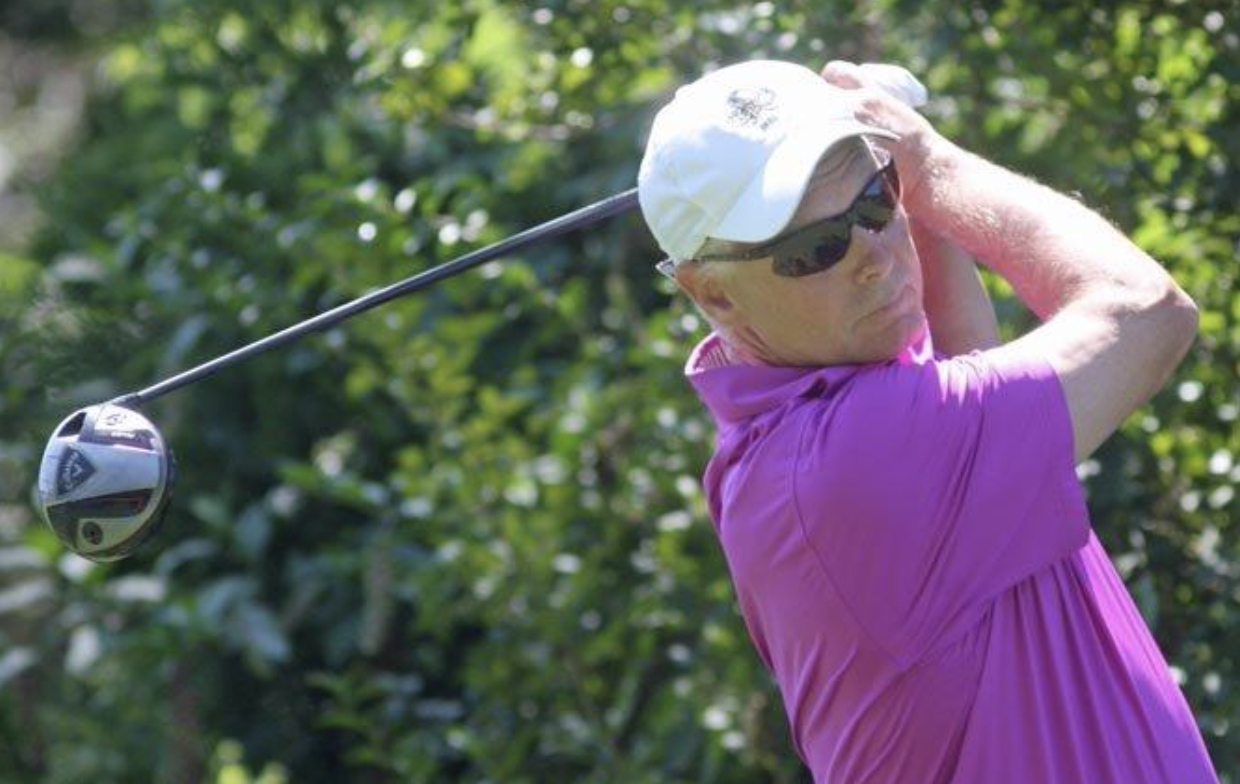
Stilwell Wins the Staten Island Slam

In 2013, Stilwell became the only man to complete the "Staten Island Slam" — winning the Staten Island Amateur, Staten Island Classic, Senior Amateur and Senior Classic in the same year. In 2017, Stilwell was the first golfer to win in consecutive years since Pete Meurer completed the three-peat from 1999-2001. His five Staten Island Amateur victories ties him for second in the tournament's history with Meurer. Stilwell captured his first Senior Amateur crown in 2009 and followed with wins in 2013, 2016, 2020, and 2022, the second-most of all time. In 2024, Stilwell was inducted into the Staten Island Sports Hall of Fame.

== Personal life ==
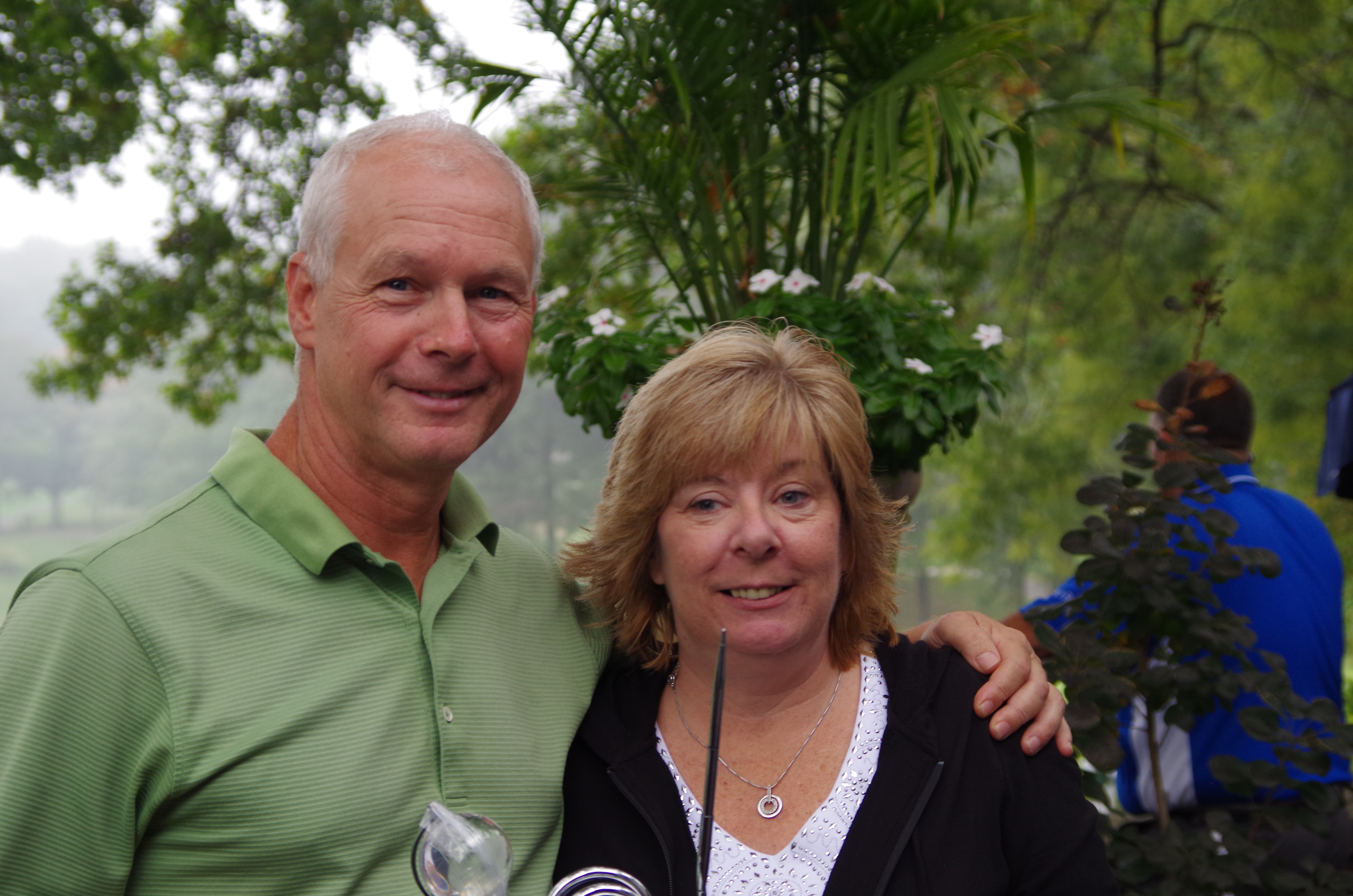
Celebrating the Staten Island Slam

Stilwell met his wife, Jane Sullivan, during a softball game for the Staten Island District Attorney's Office. At the time, Stilwell was interning at the District Attorney's Office, and Jane, whose father served as the Staten Island District Attorney, was attending the game as a spectator. They got married at St. Ann's RC Church, in January 19, 1985. Jane's father is the late Honorable Justice Thomas Sullivan. Together, they have four children: a daughter, Elizabeth, a daughter, Jacqueline, a daughter, Kristen, and a son, Thomas. As of October, 2024, the Stilwells have five grandchildren: Stephen, Harper, Catherine, Ellie, and Caroline.

Stilwell has four surviving siblings: a brother, Winslow Stilwell, CPA, a brother, Dwight Stilwell, a sister, Anne Marie Stilwell, MD, and a sister, Tina Stilwell. Dwight Stilwell was the star quarterback of L&M Tavern, a team inducted into the Staten Island Sports Hall of Fame in 2023 that won 46 consecutive games and four straight regular-season and playoff championships in the Staten Island Touch Tackle League.

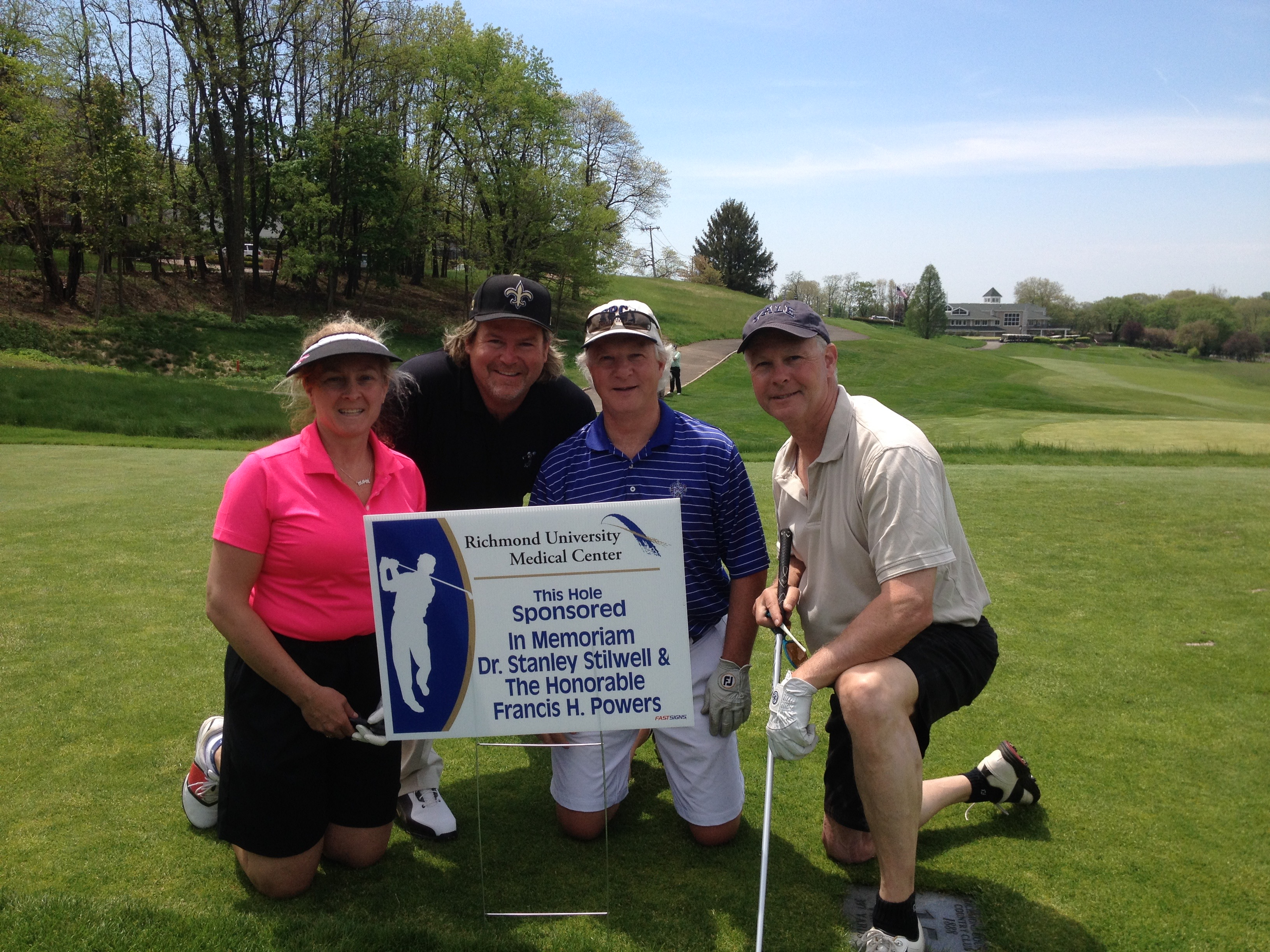
Dr. Stanley Stilwell Memorial Award at RUMC Golf Outing

Stilwell's oldest brother, Stanley Stilwell, MD, died in March 21, 2003, of pancreatic cancer. The Stanley Stilwell, MD, Memorial Award is presented annually at the Richmond University Medical Center's Annual Golf, Tennis and Bocce Outing. It recognizes Dr. Stilwell’s family’s Staten Island legacy of giving back to the community and awarded each year to a deserving physician in the borough. Dr. Stilwell organized golf competitions between the St. Vincent’s staff and the Bayley Seton staff. Dr. Stilwell, along with his brother Dwight, was inducted into the Staten Island Sports Hall of Fame in 2023, as a member of the L&M Tavern Touch Tackle Football team.

Stilwell's youngest brother, Matthew Stilwell, died on July 9, 2012, as a result of voluntary manslaughter committed by his best friend of 20 years. In 1979, Matthew was awarded the Iron Horse Award by the New York City Public School Athletic League (PSAL), recognizing him as the top high school golfer across New York City's five boroughs.

== Awards ==
- Iron Horse Award in 1975.
- YMCA Distinguished Service to Youth, Family and Community Award
- Inducted into Staten Island Sports Hall of Fame in 2024.

== Amateur wins ==
No.	Date	Tournament	Course	Qualifying/winning score
1	1984	Staten Island Amateur	Richmond County Country Club	67-76=143
2	1986	Staten Island Classic	LaTourette Golf Course	
3	2004	Staten Island Amateur	Richmond County Country Club	
4	2006	Staten Island Classic	Silver Lake Golf Course	
5	2009	Staten Island Senior Amateur	Richmond County Country Club	
6	2009	Staten Island Senior Classic		
7	2010	Staten Island Classic	LaTourette Golf Course	
8	2013	Staten Island Senior Classic	LaTourette Golf Course	
9	2013	Staten Island Classic	South Shore Country Club	
10	2013	Staten Island Amateur	Richmond County Country Club	
11	2013	Staten Island Senior Amateur	Richmond County Country Club	
12	2015	Staten Island Senior Classic		
13	2016	Staten Island Amateur	Richmond County Country Club	
14	2016	Staten Island Senior Amateur	Richmond County Country Club	
15	2017	Staten Island Amateur	Richmond County Country Club	
16	2018	New York City Amateur (50+ Age Division)	LaTourette Golf Course	72-75=147
17	2020	Staten Island Golf Association	Silver Lake Golf Course	73-69=142
18	2020	Staten Island Senior Amateur	Silver Lake Golf Course	
19	2021	Staten Island Senior Classic		
20	2021	Staten Island Golf Association		
21	2022	New York City Amateur (60+ Age Division)	LaTourette Golf Course	
22	2022	Steven F. Zuntag Staten Island Classic	LaTourette Golf Course	71-72-68=211
23	2022	Steven F. Zuntag Staten Island Senior Classic	South Shore Country Club	71-72=143
24	2022	Staten Island Senior Amateur	Richmond County Country Club	
25	2022	Staten Island Golf Association		
26	2023	Steven F. Zuntag Staten Island Classic	LaTourette Golf Course	70-70-76=216
27	2023	Steven F. Zuntag Staten Island Senior Classic	South Shore Golf Course	70-70=140
28	2023	New York City Amateur (60+ Age Division)	LaTourette Golf Course	
