= Bone malrotation =

- Other names: Bone malalignment
- Specialty: Orthopedics
- Complications: Osteoarthritis
- Types: Main occurrences are femoral and tibial malrotation
- Causes: Surgical Complication after fracture
- Treatment: Compensatory methods or Osteotomy

Bone malrotation refers to the situation that results when a bone heals out of rotational alignment from another bone, or part of bone. It often occurs as the result of a surgical complication after a fracture where intramedullary nailing (IMN) occurs, especially in the femur and tibial bones, but can also occur genetically at birth. The severity of this complication is often neglected due to its complexity to detect and treat, yet if left untreated, bone malrotation can significantly impact regular bodily functioning, and even lead to severe arthritis. Detection throughout history has become more advanced and accurate, ranging from clinical assessment to ultrasounds to CT (computed tomography) scans. Treatment can include an osteotomy, a major surgical procedure where bones are cut and realigned correctly, or compensatory methods, where individuals learn to externally or internally rotate their limb to compensate for the rotation. Further research is currently being examined in this area to reduce occurrences of malrotation, including detailed computer navigation to improve visual accuracy during surgery.

== Cause ==
Bone malrotation predominantly occurs after an injury where a bone is fractured, however malrotation can genetically occur during foetal development. It usually occurs during a surgery which involves intramedullary nailing, which is the insertion of metal rods and nails to stabilise bones. Nailing is used as it requires minimal surgical dissection, less disruption of the fracture hematoma and allows faster functionality to a patient post-surgery. However, due to the semi-closed nature of IM, it is impossible to correct under direct vision, so there is less rotational control compared to traditional open methods such as plate fixation. As a result, in many cases of intramedullary nailing, the bone is misaligned which causes malrotated regrowth. This torsional error is a major problem for femoral and tibial fractures, and occurs in 17 to 35% of patients who receive these surgeries, and up to 40% of femur fracture patients.

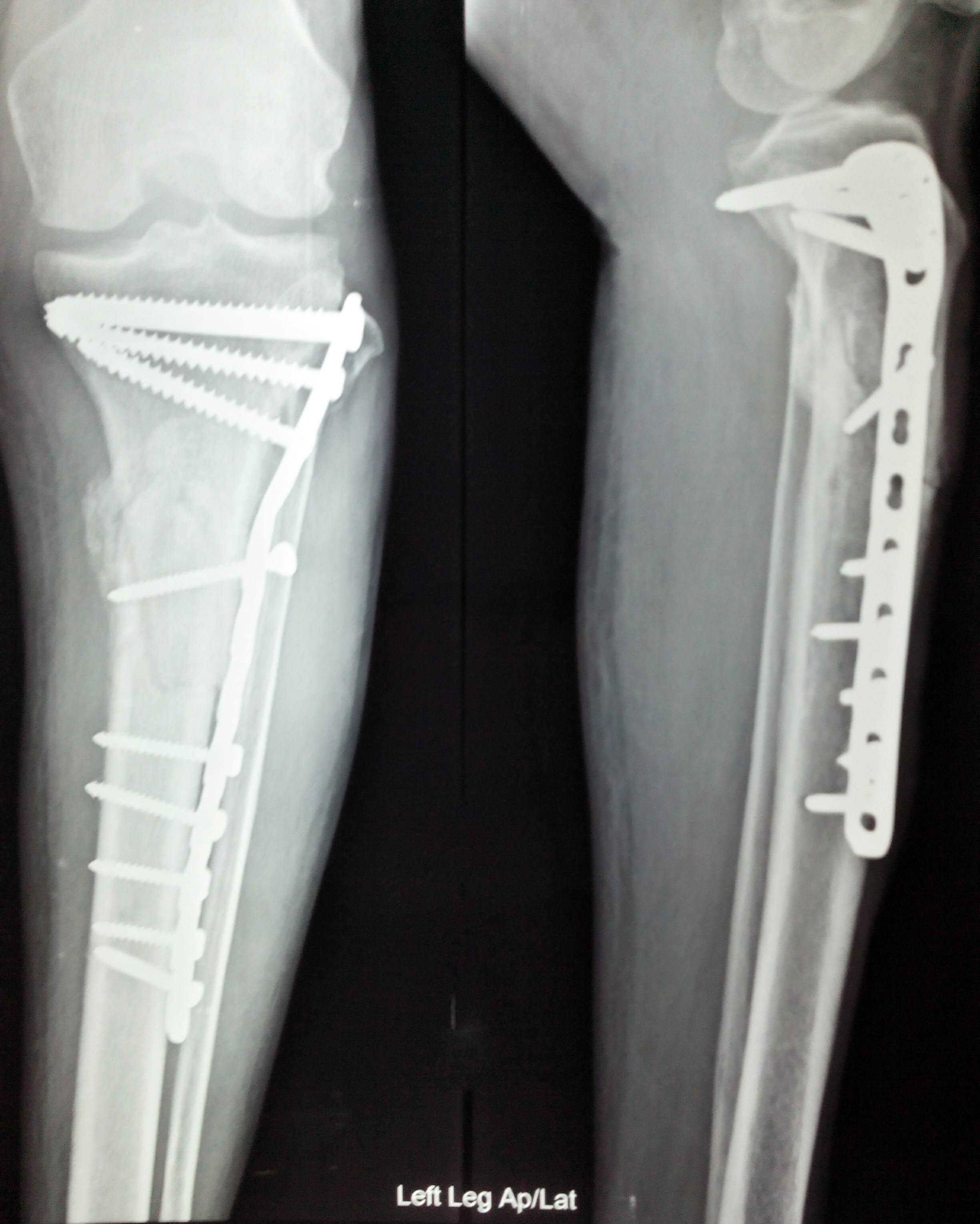
An x-ray of intramedullary nailing in a tibial fracture

Femoral malrotation is the most significant bone malrotation issue, and these errors cause cosmetic problems but can also cause drastic physical problems.

Historically, bone malrotation occurred due to a lack of adequate treatment measures, where fixation methods such as traction, casting and non-locked nails provided poor torsional stability. Currently, the utilisation of locked intramedullary nailing, has reduced the occurrence of rotational malalignment during fracture healing, yet femoral malrotation continues to remain very prevalent due to surgeon's inability to reliably restore the pre-injury alignment during operation. A high attention to detail is necessary intra-operatively to avoid this complication when locking the intramedullary device. The utilisation of both radiological and clinical assessment techniques to compare with an injured limb would also help prevent bone malrotation, however these can be difficult and inexact methods of assessment, which is why complications are so common.

== Diagnosis ==
It is difficult to assess and diagnose the rotational malalignment of a bone after an operation, and many methodologies have been developed.

=== Clinical assessment ===
Clinical assessment and observation is one methodology, however it is unreliable, and can lead to complications. For femoral or tibial malrotation, many surgeons use the patient's ankle or patella to symmetrically align them with the injured side or to the floor but this method does not consider the position of the proximal fragment and could be moved during reduction attempts. In order to measure femoral malalignment, many doctors will compare the internal and external rotation of both hips, while the patient is supine or prone, and a change in a patient's range of movement indicates malrotation. However, while clinical assessment can indicate the direction of malrotation, it often reports inaccurate measurements of the degree of malalignment, so it is unreliable in determining the potential impacts and necessary treatment methods.

=== Radiography ===
Another diagnosis methodology sometimes utilised are radiographs; however, they are unreliable as they require difficult patient positioning to quantify the rotational deformity. This difficulty is due to a patient's restriction in movement, as they may exhibit post-traumatic deformities and severe pain. To determine the level of femoral malrotation, with this method, two radiographs of the pelvis and upper legs must be made. Firstly, an anteroposterior (AP) perspective which shows the degree of difference between the femoral neck and femur, and another view where the hips and knees are both flexed to a right angle, which determines antetorsion. Both of these radiographs are utilised to calculate the angle of anteversion of the femoral neck.

=== Ultrasounds ===
Ultrasounds can also be used to measure bone malrotation, and are considered highly reliable. The main issue with utilising ultrasound measurement is that it relies largely on the skills of an ultrasound technician, and consequently is not widely used. When measuring femoral malrotation with ultrasounds, a patient's thighs are fixed symmetrically while the degree of rotation of the femoral shaft is measured. This methodology requires exact positioning of a patient to correctly measure any deformity.

=== MRI scans ===
MRI scans can be utilised and are proven to be reliable and effective at determining malrotation of bones. However, they are not as readily available as CT scanners, and are also time consuming and very expensive.

=== CT scans ===
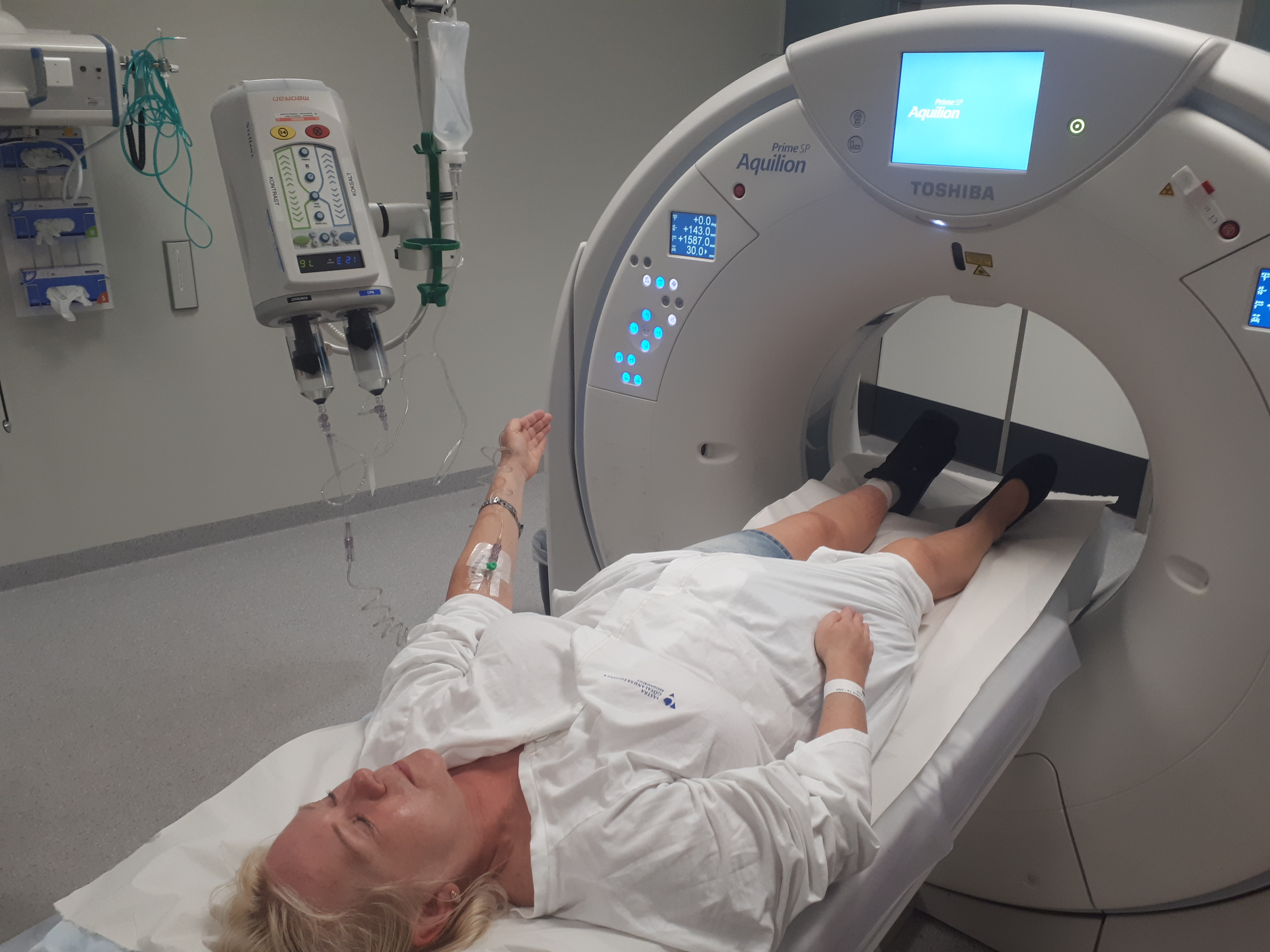
A person getting a CT scan.

The standard bone malrotation detection practice utilised are computed tomography scans, which are able to exactly quantify the amount of rotational malalignment. It is also considered highly reliable and utilised because of its reproducibility. For femoral malrotation, the scan involves doctors measuring the angle between a line through the axis of the femoral neck and a line tangential to the femoral condyles. The angle difference between the uninjured and injured sides determines the degree of malrotation. An increase in the anteversion of the femoral neck of the injured side denotes internal rotation, and a decrease means external rotation has occurred. Another advantage of CT scans is that patient positioning does not impact the measurement accuracy of femoral torsion, which is unlike radiographs and ultrasounds. However, inaccurate measurements of malrotation can still occur in CT scans, but are mostly related difficulty in drawing clear and accurate lines along the femoral neck within the image. To avoid this inaccuracy, there needs to be improved accuracy of the line drawn, and this can be fixed by the utilisation of multi-image superimposed projection of the CT images so a more accurate measurement can be drawn.

== Impacts ==
Whilst malrotation of a bone can be tolerated for most cases, it can still cause severe impacts on functional outcome for some patients. Whilst tibial fractures are the most common long bone fractures, it is malrotation of the femur which can cause the most significant impacts on regular functioning.

If untreated, femoral malrotation can cause considerable gait disturbance and abnormal hip joint pressures. Malrotation of the femur in the setting of a mid-shaft fracture has an impact on the axis of the entire leg, which shifts the centre of force in the knee away from its neutral position. Consequently, femoral malrotation has significant impacts on the mechanical axis and force vectors within the knee. This can cause pain in the hip and knee, and patients may be limited in their movement, which can impair their function, especially in physically demanding activities such as walking up stairs and running. This can impact a person's satisfaction in life, as they may be physically unable to do things they want and need to, such as for laborious work, leisure activities, or raising a family, which can have significant impacts on their psychological health. Femoral malrotation can also cause an abnormally rotated foot, as the angle of a person's foot is directly related to the angle of the femur.

Another significant long-term consequence of femoral malrotation if untreated is degenerative arthritis of the hip and knee. This joint arthrosis occurs as there is a proven correlation between rotational error, axis deviation and arthrosis of the knee and hip joints. However, the severity of the arthrosis is dependent on the percentage of malrotation.

Whilst most malrotation problems occurred during surgery, patients with 10° or less difference of malrotation compared with the uninjured side rarely complained of any issues. However, patients with differences greater than 15° found noticeable issues, and above 30° malrotation difference resulted in serious complaints. External femoral malrotation is usually much better tolerated than internal malrotation. However, older studies have found that external rotational deformities are more poorly tolerated, which shows the need for more research in this area.

== Treatment ==
There are two main treatment methods; corrective surgery to fix the malrotation, or compensatory methods where patients learn to compensate for any malrotation when walking.

=== Compensatory methods ===
Many people with bone malrotation, such as femoral malrotation are able to functionally tolerate and learn compensatory methods, such as externally or internally adjusting their limb. Patients will compensate for even considerable rotational malalignment when they are active. However, femoral malrotation is more difficult to compensate for and maintain with non-operative treatment methods. Patients with femoral malrotation of less than 15 degrees give less complaints than those with higher amounts of malalignment, yet many patients are able to tolerate the deformity well.

=== Osteotomy ===
In extreme cases, the malalignment can be treated by means of a derotational osteotomy which is a major surgical procedure. It can be conducted around the existing intramedullary fixtures, but it usually requires a subtrochanteric osteotomy, which is an invasive surgical approach where bone is cut and realigned. As this is a major procedure, it is beneficial if discovered early, before callus has set, and consequently, patients should be assessed for malrotation in the early post-operative period and a CT scan should occur if abnormalities are found. Correct measurement of bone malalignment with a CT scan is vital when considering an osteotomies in fixing rotational deformities, as torsional differences below 15 degrees are often easily compensated for with non surgical treatment. Revision surgery should be avoided, if not necessary, as implementing femoral nails for a second time leads to higher rates of problems such as infection, nonunion, or nail destabilisation due to overlapping holes for the interlocking screws.

== Further research ==
There is currently limited clinical attention in the area of bone malrotation and research into more accurate methods, likely due to the complexity of the issue. Whilst computed tomography scans are useful in determining the degree of bone malrotation after a surgery has occurred, research is being conducted into how to prevent this deformity occurring at all during surgery. CT scans are impractical intraoperatively due to high cost, lack of equipment portability and increased exposure to radiation.

Consequently, one area being researched is that of computer navigation, which could be utilised during these surgeries to avoid malalignment issues. Computer assisted surgery (CAS) matches a patient's anatomy with pre or intraoperatively generated fluoroscopic image data, by using camera detected infrared signals. The computer then calculates the positioning of each component and creates a visual of their position on the monitor. As a result, the surgeon can monitor in real time the position of the surgical instruments in relation to the patient's anatomy and conducts the procedure accordingly. The surgeon can plan the torsional adjustment and control the fracture reduction and nail insertion on a touchscreen of the navigation module.

Currently, this navigation may add extra time during surgery, so it is sometimes considered unnecessary in an urgent surgery. However, without computer navigation, the risk of bone malrotation is significantly increased. The benefit of computer navigation means that surgeons are able to view more clearly and restore axial alignment, but also ensure the injured limb and matches the alignment and length of the uninjured limb. CAS provides increased surgical accuracy and safety for both patients and surgeons, radiation time is reduced, and it utilises minimally invasive techniques which means less tissue damage, improved wound healing, and reduced infections and scarring for patients.
