= Dror Paley =

Canadian-trained orthopedic surgeon (born 1956)

Dror Paley M.D., FRCSC
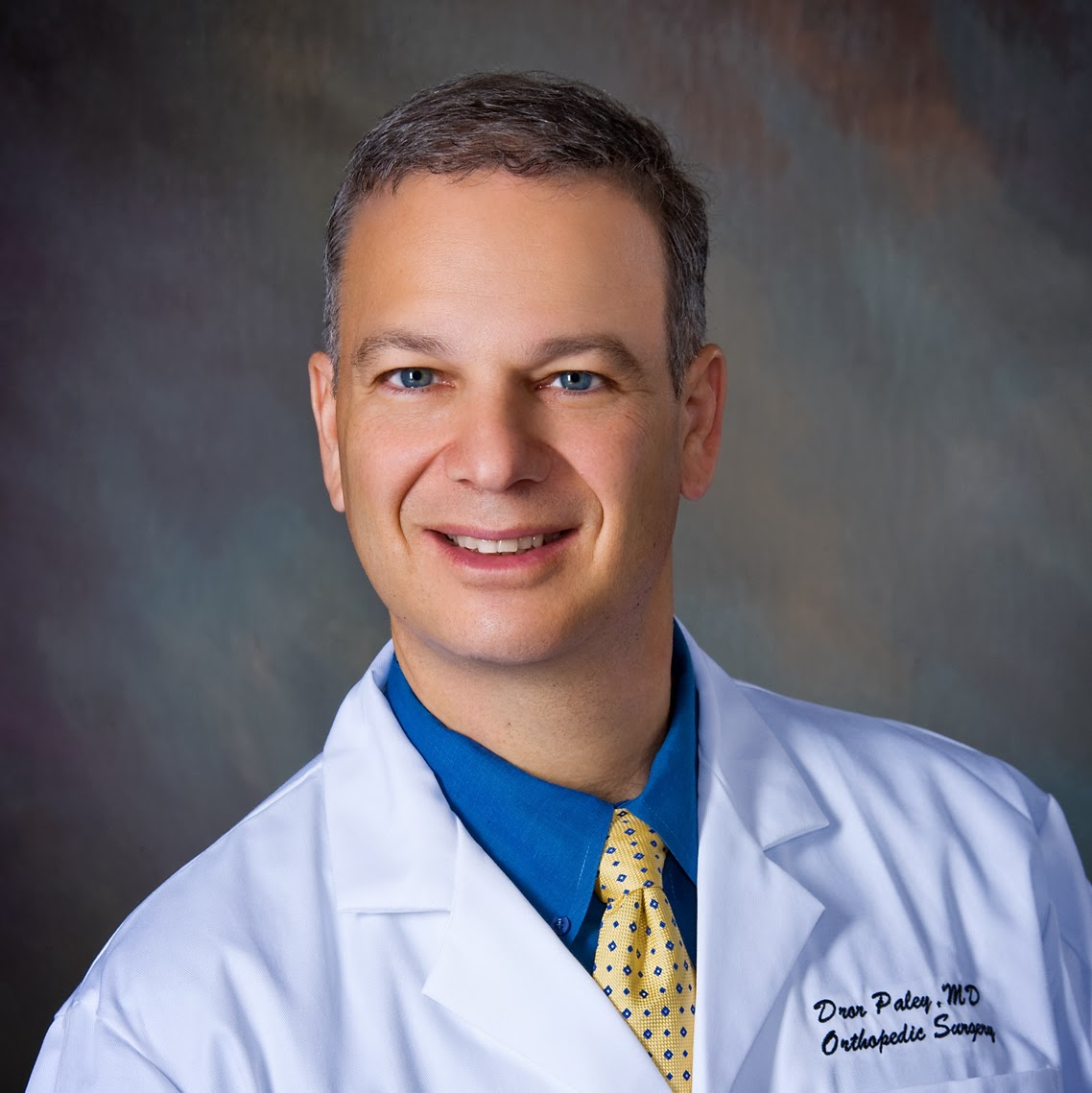
- Born: March 25, 1956 (age 70); Israel
- Citizenship: United States, Canada
- Education: University of Toronto (MD)
- Occupation: Physician
- Medical career
- Field: Orthopedic surgery
- Institutions: Paley Orthopedic & Spine Institute
- Sub-specialties: Limb lengthening; deformity correction; anthropometric cosmetology
- Website: www.paleyinstitute.org

Dror Paley (born March 25, 1956) is a Canadian-American orthopedic surgeon, who specializes in limb lengthening, including anthropometric cosmetology and deformity correction procedures.

== Career ==
Paley has been licensed with the Province of Ontario, Canada, since 1980, the Maryland Board of Physicians since 1986, and with the Florida Department of Health since 2009.

Paley earned his Doctor of Medicine from the University of Toronto Medical School in 1979. He trained in surgery at the Johns Hopkins Hospital before returning to the University of Toronto to train in orthopedic surgery. He worked at the University of Maryland as a professor of Orthopedics and chief of Pediatric Orthopedics.

In 1991, Paley co-founded the Maryland Center for Limb Lengthening and Reconstruction at James Lawrence Kernan Hospital with Dr. John Herzenberg. In 2001, they formed the International Center for Limb Lengthening at Sinai Hospital. In 2002, he authored a book, Principles of Deformity Correction (ISBN 3-540-41665-X), that was edited by Herzenberg.

Paley was among the first orthopedic surgeons to use the PRECICE intramedullary nail for cosmetic leg lengthening as well as its second version (PRECICE 2). The Paley Institute is one of the world's most popular medical tourism locations, with people traveling for both cosmetic and medical reasons. The clinic performed roughly 10 height-increasing surgeries a year until 2011, when the procedure became more popular thereafter. In 2025, the clinic performed 155. In 2026, the Paley Institute became the first clinic to provide the PRECICE MAX nail that allows greater weight-bearing for patients.

In 2013, Smith & Nephew released a new Modular Rail System for external fixation and limb deformity correction, in collaboration with Paley.

Paley had developed around 100 surgical procedures for limb reconstruction as of 2014.

=== Limb lengthening training ===
Paley specializes in limb-lengthening and limb-corrective surgeries (usually in the legs). He was trained in limb lengthening by Gavriil Ilizarov, who created the "Ilizarov method" of limb reconstruction, technically known as distraction osteogenesis, where bone is separated from itself using an Ilizarov apparatus and regrows into the created gap over time. Paley is credited with bringing the Ilizarov method to the West and claims to have performed the first recorded Western attempt at it in April 1987.

== Personal life ==
Paley was born in Israel on March 25, 1956, and he was raised in Canada, before he moved to the United States in 1987. He lives in West Palm Beach with his wife Jennifer and stepson. He has three adult children.

== Bibliography ==
- Paley, Dror (1994). Malalignment and Realignment of the Lower Extremity. W.B. Saunders Company.
- Zorzi, Alessandro Rozim; Rosén, Annika; Pommer, Bernhard; Lei, Deng; Paley, Dror (2012). Congenital Pseudarthrosis of the Tibia: Combined Pharmacologic and Surgical Treatment Using Biphosphonate Intravenous Infusion and Bone Morphogenic Protein with Periosteal and Cancellous Autogenous Bone Grafting, Tibio-Fibular Cross Union, Intramedullary. INTECH Open Access Publisher. ISBN 9789535103240.
- Paley, Dror (2014) [2002]. Principles of Deformity Correction (Softcover and digital reprint ed.). Springer. ISBN 9783642593734.
- Paley, Dror; Birch, John; Prince, Daniel (2017). Congenital Deficiencies of the Long Bones: Reconstruction of Congenital Femoral Deficiency, Fibular and Tibial Hemimelia, and Radial and Ulnar Aplasias. Springer Berlin Heidelberg. ISBN 9783540881087.
