= Suzuki frame =

Medical device

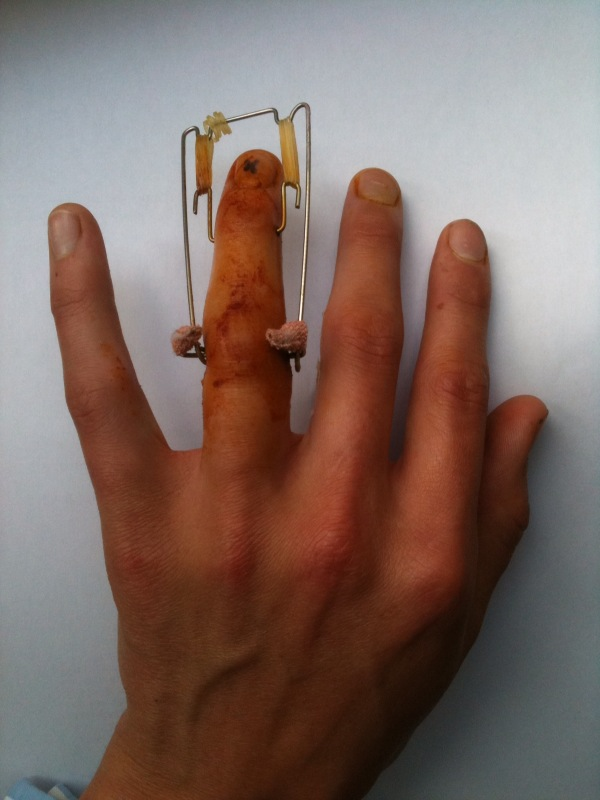
A suzuki frame being used in the treatment of an injured ring (fourth) finger

A Suzuki frame is a medical device, used for helping heal broken fingers, especially those with deep, complex intra-articular fractures. Rubber bands are used to generate traction between two metal Kirschner wires that are inserted into the bone on either side of a fracture.

The device was named after its inventor, Yasushi Suzuki, who first described it in 1994.
