= Gerhard Küntscher =

German surgeon

Gerhard Küntscher (6 December 1900 – 17 December 1972 (aged 72)) was a German surgeon who pioneered the intramedullary nailing of long bone fractures.

== Biography ==
Küntscher was born in Zwickau, Germany.

Küntscher invented what is known as the Küntscher nail, an internal fixation device used to maintain the position of the fracture fragments during healing. The nail is rigid and has a cloverleaf shape in cross-section.

Küntscher first performed the process using the nail in November 1939 at the University Department of Surgery in Kiel. He first presented 12 cases of intramedullary fixation with rods at a surgical meeting in Berlin 03/18/40 and was met with general disapproval for using surgery for fractures The German military initially disapproved of Kuntscher's IM nailing technique but introduced it in 1942.

While in the Finnish Lapland from 1942 to 1944, Küntscher taught Finnish surgeons to do intramedullary nailings, which earned him recognition and respect in the orthopedic community. The war also prevented the knowledge of Küntscher's use of the IM nail to exit Germany. The German military had the upper hand in treating soldiers with the IM nail and having them return to fighting status in just a few weeks. Worldwide knowledge was not established until the prisoners of war (POW's) returned to their home countries carrying Küntscher's legacy in the form of steel nails in their legs. Returned POW's included airmen who had parachuted and broken femurs on landing. Künstscher had been reassigned to a Luftwaffe hospital outside of Berlin and Luftwaffe POW's were treated there. All previous treatment of femur fractures required 6 weeks of bed rest and Allied doctors debriefing the returnees were astonished that they were up and walking in days after surgery.

A. W. Fischer, head of Küntscher's department, said in 1944 about his invention: "This practical treatment of fractures using a nail, the Küntscher procedure, is, in my eyes, the greatest revolution in the treatment of bone fractures since the invention of nail extension by Klapp, and this revolution will conquer the world."
