= Cannulated cow =

Cow surgically fitted with a cannula

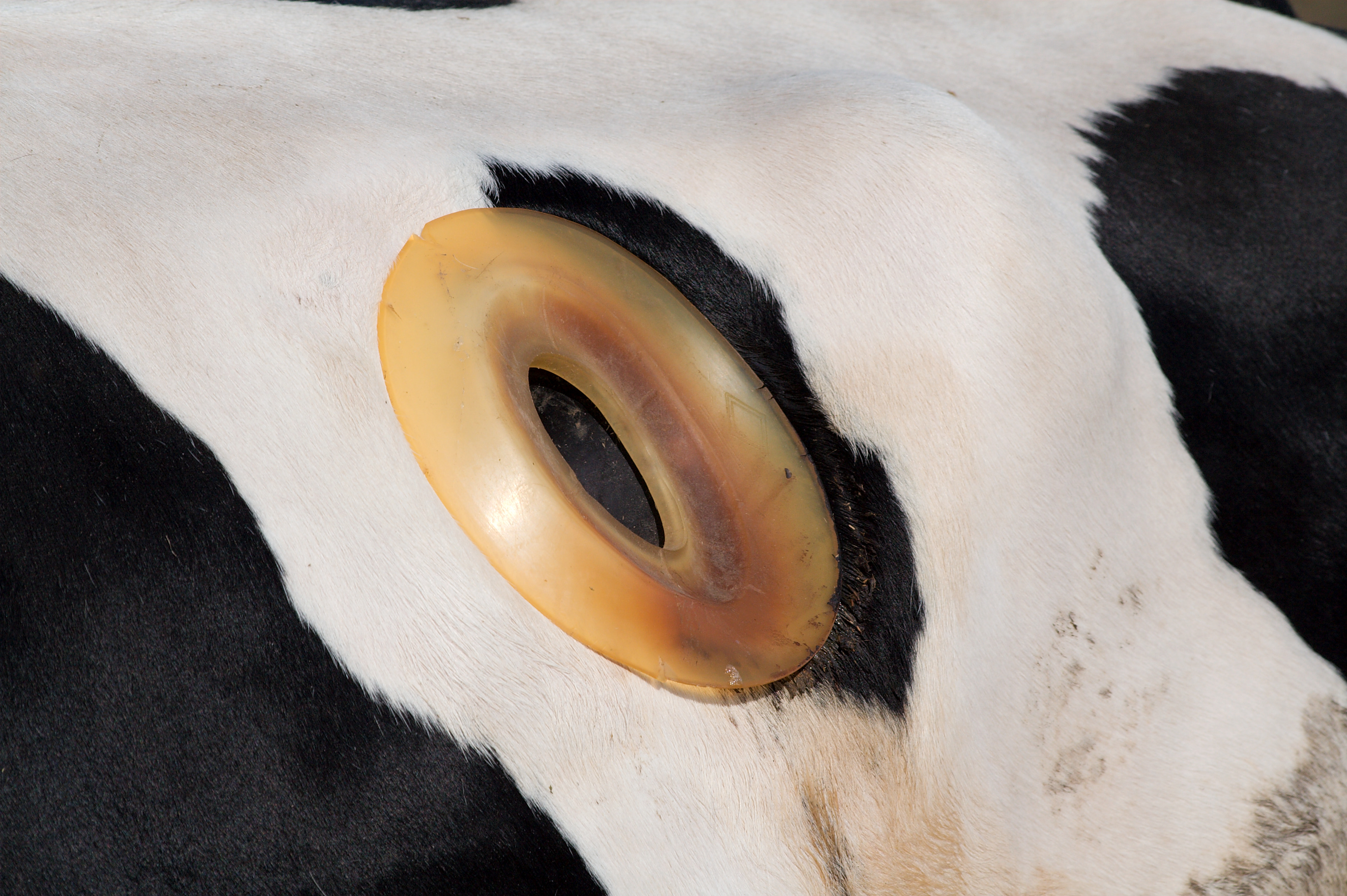
A cannula in a cow's side.

A cannulated cow or fistulated cow refers to a cow that has been surgically fitted with a cannula. A cannula acts as a porthole-like device that allows access to the rumen of a cow, to perform research and analysis of the digestive system and to allow veterinarians to transplant rumen contents from one cow to another.

The practice of rumen cannulation was first documented in 1928 by Arthur Frederick Schalk and R.S. Amadon of North Dakota Agricultural College.

== Surgical implantation ==
Cannulation requires installing a flanged rubber cylinder in the side of a cow, behind its 13th rib. The cylinder typically is fitted with a plastic, rubber, or metal cap to keep the rumen anaerobic.

The rubber cannula is surgically implanted while the cow is standing and awake, with local anesthetic. The cow is made to fast and refrain from drinking water for 24 hours in advance of the surgery. Then the veterinarian excises a small piece of the cow's skin, makes an incision through the rumen, and stitches the open sides of the rumen to the edges of skin, to prevent the contents of the rumen from leaking into the rest of the abdominal cavity. Finally, the inner flange of the cannula is pushed inside the rumen and capped.

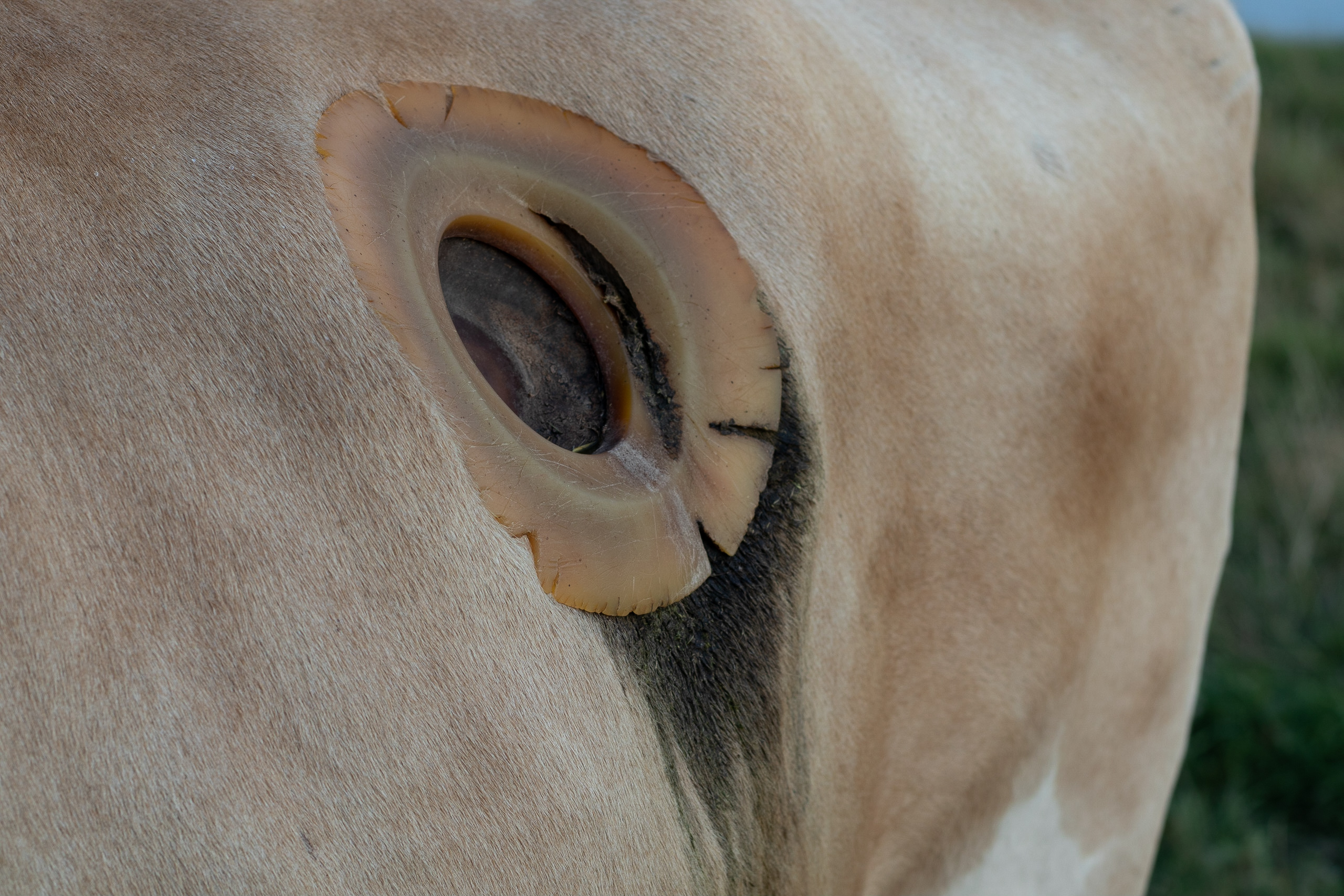
A cannulated cow in the Agricultural Research and Teaching Center at Arkansas State University

== Reasons for cannulation ==
Cannulas are typically implanted in healthy cows to research cow digestion in a university setting, to analyze the nutritional quality of feed in an agricultural setting, or to improve the microbiome of a cow with digestive disturbance in a veterinary or agricultural setting.

=== Digestive research ===
By analyzing the chemical composition of a cow's rumen, researchers can determine the effects of different feeds and processes on bovine digestion. Many of the earliest documented reports of cannulated cows were made by researchers working to understand how feed is processed through cows. For instance, a 1939 study discovered via cannulated cows that the pH of rumen varies throughout the day, becoming most alkaline just prior to feeding. A 1956 study used cannulated cows to determine that a hay-only diet does not change the proportion of fatty acids in a cow's rumen, but every other type of feed measured does.

=== Forage analysis ===
Measuring the composition of a cow's rumen can also indicate the quality of its feed, a process called a forage analysis.

Once the cannula is surgically placed, the cow is then allowed to graze for a certain period of time—for example, 30 to 45 minutes, in a 1960 study at the University of Nevada, Reno. Researchers will then remove some or all of the ruminated material through the cannula. Analyzing rumen this way can indicate whether particular grasses on which cows are grazing are nutritionally adequate.

=== Transfaunation ===
Veterinary schools, veterinary hospitals, and bovine farming operations in North America often keep a healthy fistulated cow as a microbiota donor. Large animal veterinarians will pull the contents by hand from the healthy cow's rumen system to help repopulate the fauna in a sick cow's rumen. This process is called transfaunation, or a microbiota transplant.

In Europe, the fistulation of cows to provide rumen contents for transfaunation is considered unethical, and is not practised. Instead, rumen liquor is aspirated through a rumen-fluid collector, consisting of a Frick gag and a flexible hose with a perforated metal tip which serves as a filter. The hose and tip is passed through the gag and down the oesophagus to the rumen. It is normally possible to aspirate five litres of rumen liquor using this device.

Rumen contents from a fistulated cow can also help sheep and goats, which have similar digestive systems.

A 2014 review of rumen transfaunation research indicated that the procedure has been demonstrated to help correct indigestion resulting from illness, surgical correction of displaced abomasum, and ingestion of toxic plants.

== Ethical implications ==
Though veterinarians and bovine farmers point to the effectiveness of transfaunation for treating digestive disease, many animal rights groups argue that the practice is unnecessarily harmful to the quality of life of the cannulated cow. Use of a rumen-fluid collector instead of fistulation is well tolerated by the donor cow. People for the Ethical Treatment of Animals points to the surgery's four- to six-week recovery period and suggests that arguments for the health benefits of cannulation obscure the profit motive of the dairy industry: "While some claim that this transfer can improve the health of cows, the procedure seems mostly to benefit the meat and dairy industries' bottom lines—optimizing food and digestion for animals who will ultimately be exploited and slaughtered." Similarly, The New Zealand Anti-Vivisection Society describes the practice as "cruel, insensitive and barbaric [...] the epitome of using cows as mere objects, like cars with gas tanks."

The fact-checking site Snopes has argued that the description of a circulating video of a cannulated cow as "abuse" is a "miscategorization," saying that cannulation "is neither a form of abuse nor a method to increase dairy production." However, rumen cannulation has long been used by the dairy industry to study methods that improve milk production. For instance, a 1940 study used cannulated cows to determine that a vitamin-rich diet makes for more antiscorbutic milk than a vitamin-poor diet, and a 2004 study used cannulated cows to evaluate treatments for a pH imbalance called subacute ruminal acidosis that is of concern to dairy farmers primarily because it damages milk production.
