= Cannulated bar =

Bar with a central hollow used in medicine

A cannulated bar is a bar manufactured with a central hollow that has several medical applications. A cannulated bar is differentiated from a standard medical cannula by its greater outer diameter and wall thickness.

== Applications ==
Cannulated bars are used as intramedullary rods for the fixation of long bone fractures. The central hollow promotes marrow regrowth. In this application, a Kirschner wire may be fed through the hollow to provide fixation and traction at each end of the implant. Cannulated bars are also used as raw material, in the manufacturing of cannulated screws, drills, taps and medical instruments.
