= Anthropometric cosmetology =

Medical practice to correct deformity

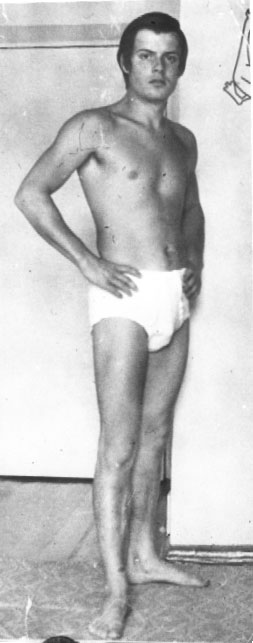
Before tibial lengthening

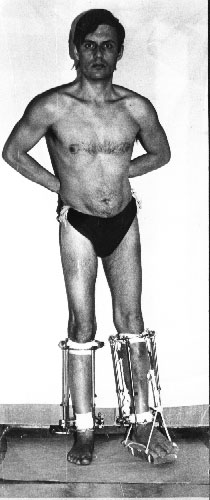
Period of tibial lengthening

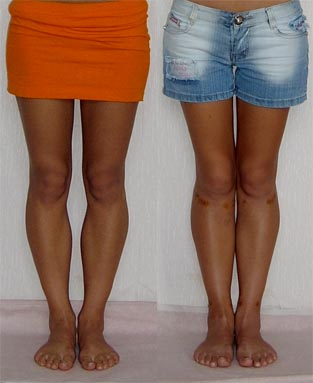
Tibia before correction and tibia after correction, immediately after Ilizarov apparatus removal

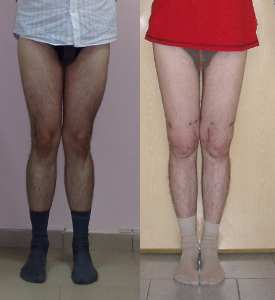
Correction of X-shaped curvature

Anthropometric cosmetology is the medical practice to correct or modify deformities in the upper and lower extremities of the body. This is done in order to attain an aesthetically pleasing appearance or to eliminate physical and psychological discomforts.

== History ==
Anthropometric (orthopedic) cosmetology appeared in the 1990s based on traumatology, orthopedic, and aesthetic surgery. In 1965, Gavriil Ilizarov determined that bone fragments could be carefully pulled apart without disrupting their alignment. These bone fragments could then grow back to a complete form. This discovery was groundbreaking for the fields of traumatology orthopedics. In complex cases of comminuted fractures, the Ilizarov apparatus method makes it possible to avoid squeezing the remnant fragments together, which otherwise might result in shortened limbs. Traumatic injuries, as well as congenital and acquired deformities, may be treated with this technique.

Chondrodysplasia is a disease where a child's growth stops abruptly, resulting in an adult dwarf, with shortened and often deformed arms and legs and is regarded as a congenital deformity. Ilizarov began to solve the problems associated with such diseases using his own apparatus. The apparatus he initially used was modified to support the lengthening of finger (phalanx) bones. The first experiments involved stretching the bones in the arms and legs of people with chondrodysplasia. New techniques, involving artificial fractures, have been developed.

Ilizarov's followers, Kaplunov and Yegorov, first used anthropometric cosmetology in Volgograd, Russia in 1992, on a healthy patient for strictly cosmetic purposes. The surgical operation was a success: the tibia was lengthened 6 cm over 11 months. Later, this technique was used elsewhere. Yegorov, Chernov, and Nekrasov subsequently wrote a book Orthopedic Cosmetology, the first scientific publication in this field.

Surgical intervention:

- Operations for leg lengthening and other cosmetic corrections are recommended professionally for patients who are at least 17 years in age, after the complete growth zone closure occurs in the organism's body, thus minimizing future growth related problems.

Anthropometric cosmetology can be used when the patient has:

- X-shaped curvature of the legs
- O-shaped curvature of the legs
- Relative shortening of the legs relative to body length
- Psychological problems related to lack of body height.

Types of anthropometric cosmetology:

- Anthropometric correction for tibia or femurs extension in a patient.
- Anthropometric distraction for tibia or femurs lengthening in a patient.
- Simultaneous distraction and correction in the process of changing the form of the patient's legs.

== See also ==
- Body shape – General shape of a human body
  - Body proportions – Proportions of the human body in art
    - Artistic canons of body proportions – Criteria used in formal figurative art
- Distraction osteogenesis – Gradual bone lengthening
- Physical attractiveness – Aesthetic assessment of physical traits
- Body dysmorphic disorder – Mental disorder

== Bibliography ==
- 1. Yegorov M.F., Chernov A.P., Nekrasov M.S. “Orthopedic cosmetology” Publishing center “Fedorov” 2000.
- 2. Solomin L.N. “Bases of osteosynthesis per bone with Ilizarov Apparatus”, publishing office ELBI-Spb, 2005
- 3. Goldreyer M.M. “Short novels about anthropometric cosmetology. Life after the victory” publishing office “Sound book” Moscow 2009.
