= Cannula =

Tube surgically implanted in the body

A cannula

A cannula (/ˈkænjʊlə/; Latin meaning 'little reed'; pl.: cannulae or cannulas) is a tube that can be inserted into the body, often for the delivery or removal of fluid or for the gathering of samples. In simple terms, a cannula can surround the inner or outer surfaces of a trocar needle thus extending the effective needle length by at least half the length of the original needle. Its size mainly ranges from 14 to 26 gauge. Like hypodermic needles, different-sized cannulae are often color coded.

Decannulation is the permanent removal of a cannula (extubation), especially of a tracheostomy cannula, once a physician determines it is no longer needed.

== Medicine ==
Cannulas normally come with a trocar inside. The trocar is a needle, which punctures the body in order to get into the intended space.

Intravenous cannulas are the most common in hospital use. A variety of cannulas are used to establish cardiopulmonary bypass in cardiac surgery. A nasal cannula is a piece of plastic tubing that runs under the nose and is used to administer oxygen.

=== Intravenous cannulation ===
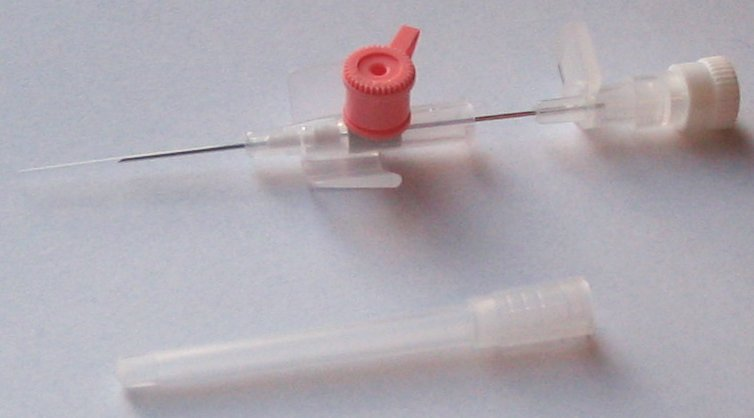
Intravenous cannula

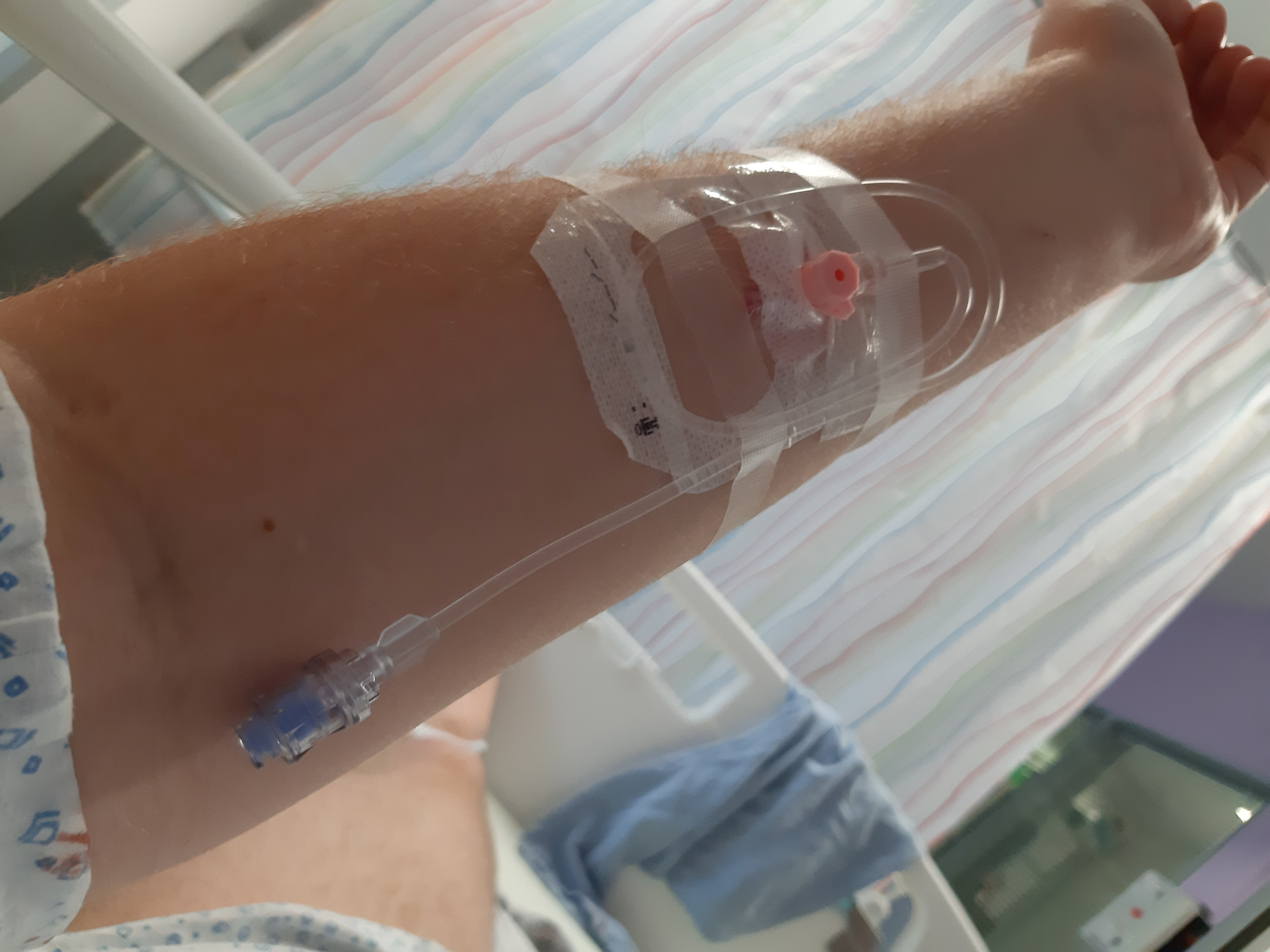
Flexile - it is inserted into a vein, and a transfusion or dropper, for example, is attached to the cannula.

A venous cannula is inserted into a vein, primarily for the administration of intravenous fluids, for obtaining blood samples and for administering medicines. An arterial cannula is inserted into an artery, commonly the radial artery, and is used during major operations and in critical care areas to measure beat-to-beat blood pressure and to draw repeated blood samples. Insertion of the venous cannula can be a painful procedure that can lead to anxiety and stress. Use of a vapocoolant (cold spray) immediately before cannulation reduces pain during the procedure, without increasing the difficulty of cannulation.

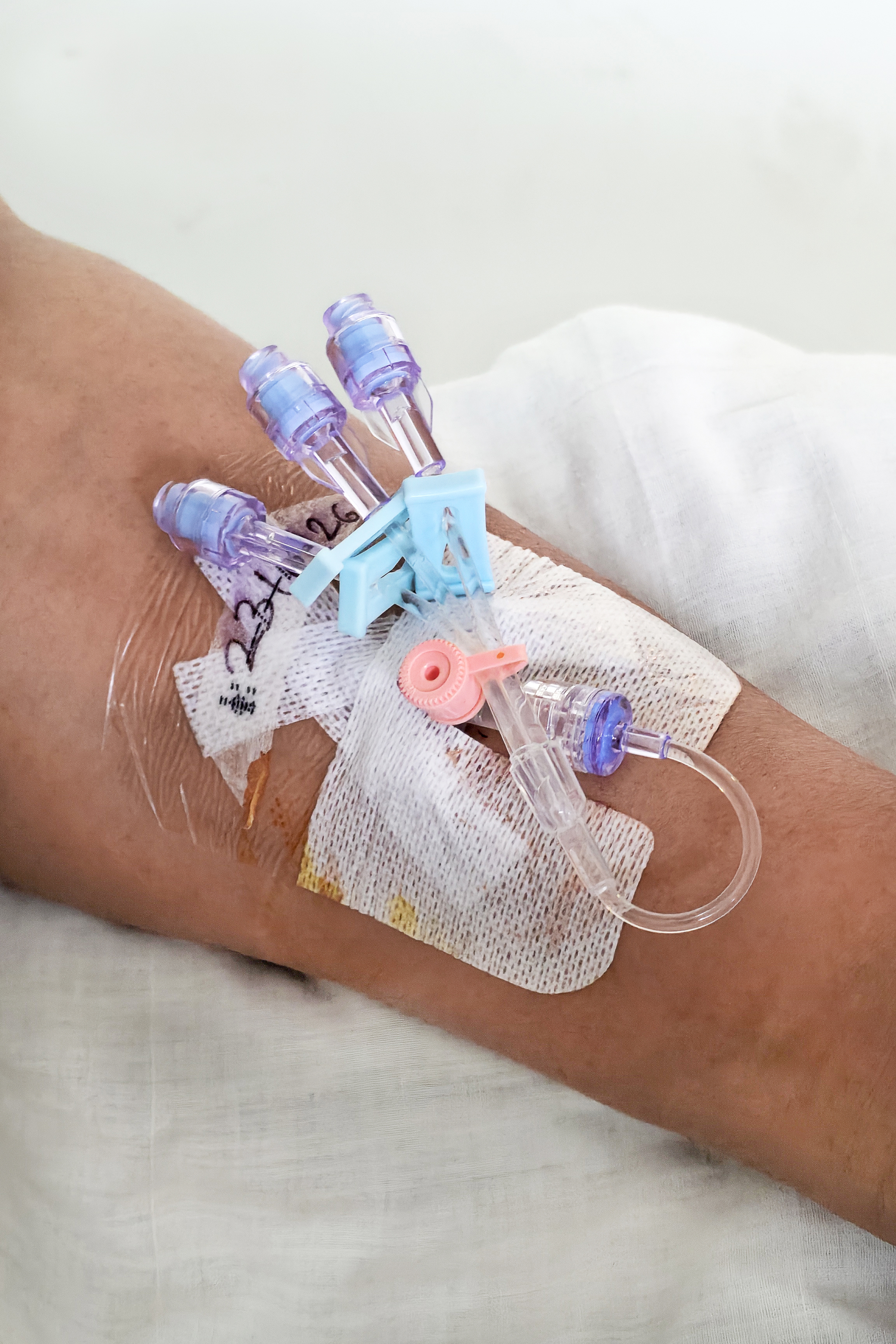
Intravenous cannula inserted in forearm

Complications may arise in the vein as a result of the cannulation procedure. The four main groups of complication are:

- hematoma: a collection of blood, which can result from failure to puncture the vein when the cannula is inserted or when the cannula is removed. The selection of an appropriate vein and gently applying pressure slightly above the insertion point on removal of the cannula may prevent this.
- infiltration: when infusate enters the subcutaneous tissue instead of the vein. To prevent this, a cannula with accurate trim distances may be used. It is essential to fix the cannula in place firmly.
- embolism: this can be caused by air, a thrombus, or fragment of a catheter breaking off and entering the venous system. It can cause a pulmonary embolism. Air emboli can be avoided by making sure that there is no air in the system. A thromboembolism can be avoided by using a smaller cannula.
- phlebitis: an inflammation of the vein resulting from mechanical or chemical irritation or from an infection. Phlebitis can be avoided by carefully choosing the site for cannulation and by checking the type of infusate used.

=== Aortic cannulation ===
An aortic cannula may be placed in the aorta, for example in a diseased ascending aorta, using the Seldinger technique.

=== Nasal cannulation and oral-nasal cannulation ===
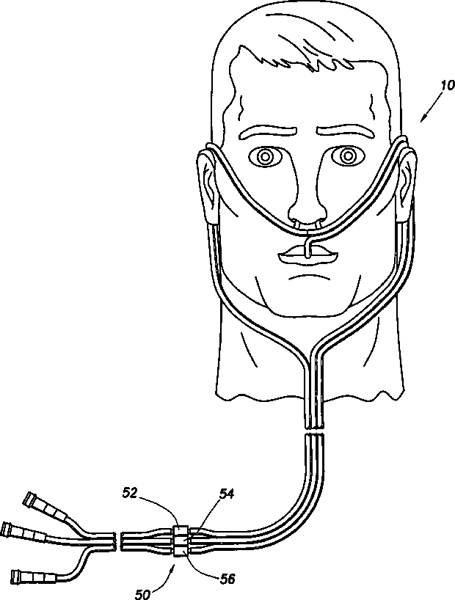
Drawing of a nasal cannula

A nasal cannula or an oral–nasal cannula consists of a flexible tube, usually with multiple short, open-ended branches for comfortable insertion into the nostrils and/or mouth, and may be used for the delivery of a gas (such as pure oxygen), a gas mixture (as, for example, during anesthesia), or to measure airflow into and out of the nose and/or mouth.

In general aviation, a nasal cannula may be used to administer oxygen in non-pressurized aircraft flying 10,000 feet above sea level.

=== Tracheostomy tube ===
The removal of a tracheostomy tube is referred to as decannulation.

== Veterinary use ==
A cannula is used in an emergency procedure to relieve pressure and bloating in cattle and sheep with ruminal tympany, due most commonly to their accidentally grazing wilted legume or legume-dominant pastures, particularly alfalfa, ladino, and red and white clover. The tube enters from the outside, crosses the abdominal cavity, and then reaches the rumen.

Much larger cannulas are used to research about the digestive system of cannulated cows.

Cannulas are a component used in the insertion of veterinary microchips. The location depends on the animal.

== Aesthetic medicine and anti-ageing ==
In aesthetic medicine, a blunt-tip cannula or microcannula (also called smooth tip microcannula, blunt tipped cannula, or simply microcannula) is a small tube with an edge that is not sharp and an extrusion port or pore near the tip which is designed for atraumatic subdermal injections of fluids or gels.

Depending on the size of the internal diameter, it can be used either for the injection of cosmetic wrinkle fillers like hyaluronic acid, collagen, poly-L-lactic acid, CaHA, etc., or for fat transfer (liposuction). The American Society for Aesthetic Plastic surgery notes additional soft tissue fillers like calcium hydroxy-apatite and polymethylmethacrylate. The advantage of using these is that they are less painful, have less risk of bruising, have less swelling, and a better safety profile. Accidental intravascular injections are more difficult with blunt-tip microcannulas, reducing the risk of skin necrosis, ulcers, and embolization to the retinal artery which can result in blindness. Indeed, in May 2015, the USA issued a warning of these risks as an FDA Safety Communication on the "Unintentional Injection of Soft Tissue Filler Into Blood Vessels In the Face".

In January 2012, the "Dermasculpt" microcannula was approved by the FDA for use in the United States for use with soft tissue fillers followed by the "Magic Needle", "Softfil", "TSK STERiGLIDE™ by Air-Tite Products", and "Sculpt-face". The primary structural differences between microcannulas is the distance of the extrusion port or pore from the tip (closer is more precise), the bluntness of the tip (tapered blunt tip is easier for entry), and the flexibility of the shaft (enough flexibility to move around sensitive structures but enough rigidity for precise placement).

Since microcannula tips are blunt, a Pilot or Introducer needle is required for entry through the skin and the technique is to thread the microcannula through this tiny opening. Microcannula cosmetic injection techniques have been developed on how to best place cosmetic wrinkle fillers such as the Long MicroCannula Double Cross-Hatched Fan and the Wiggle Progression techniques.

In April 2016, the concept of the use of microcannula to inject more than cosmetic fillers was first published. The technique of Microcannula Injected Local Anesthesia (MILA) was described on the use of microcannula to inject local anesthesia with less pain, bruising, and swelling. Also introduced were Accelerated Healing After Platelet-Rich Plasma (AHA-PRP), Accelerated Healing After Platelet-Rich Fibrin Matrix (AHA-PRFM), and the use of microcannula to dissolve Sculptra nodules.

== Body piercing ==
Cannulas are used in body piercing when using a standard IV needle (usually between 18GA and 12GA, although may be as large as 0GA, in which case the procedure is known as dermal punching and uses a biopsy punch without a cannula), and for inserting hooks for suspensions.

During piercing, the fistula is created by inserting the needle. The needle is then removed, leaving the cannula in place, which is sometimes trimmed down. The cannula is then removed and sterile jewelry is inserted into the fistula simultaneously, in order to minimise trauma to the fresh fistula caused by insertion of blunt-ended jewelry.

The procedure is especially useful when movable surface tissue is at play, such as in male genital piercings through the foreskin. There the cannula holds the wound tract in place, so that jewellery can be inserted fully through without tissue layers shifting over the process.

== Non-medical use ==
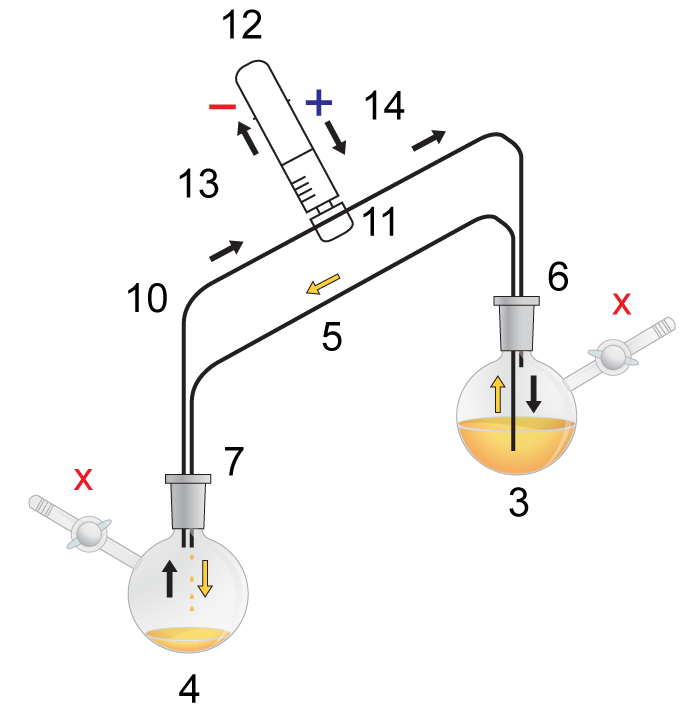
Air-sensitive cannula used in synthetic chemistry

In synthetic chemistry, a cannula refers to a piece of stainless steel or plastic tubing used to transfer liquids or gases from one vessel to another without exposure to air. See more at Cannula transfer.

In biological research, a push-pull cannula, which both withdraws and injects fluid, can be used to determine the effect of a certain chemical on a specific cell. The push part of the cannula is filled with a physiological solution plus the chemical of interest and is then injected slowly into the local cellular environment of a cell. The pull cannula then draws liquid from the extracellular medium, thus measuring the cellular response to the chemical of interest. This technique is especially used for neuroscience.

== See also ==
- Catheter
- Hypodermic needle
- Cannulated cow
- Cannulated bar
