= Intramedullary rod =

Metal rod inserted to treat fractures

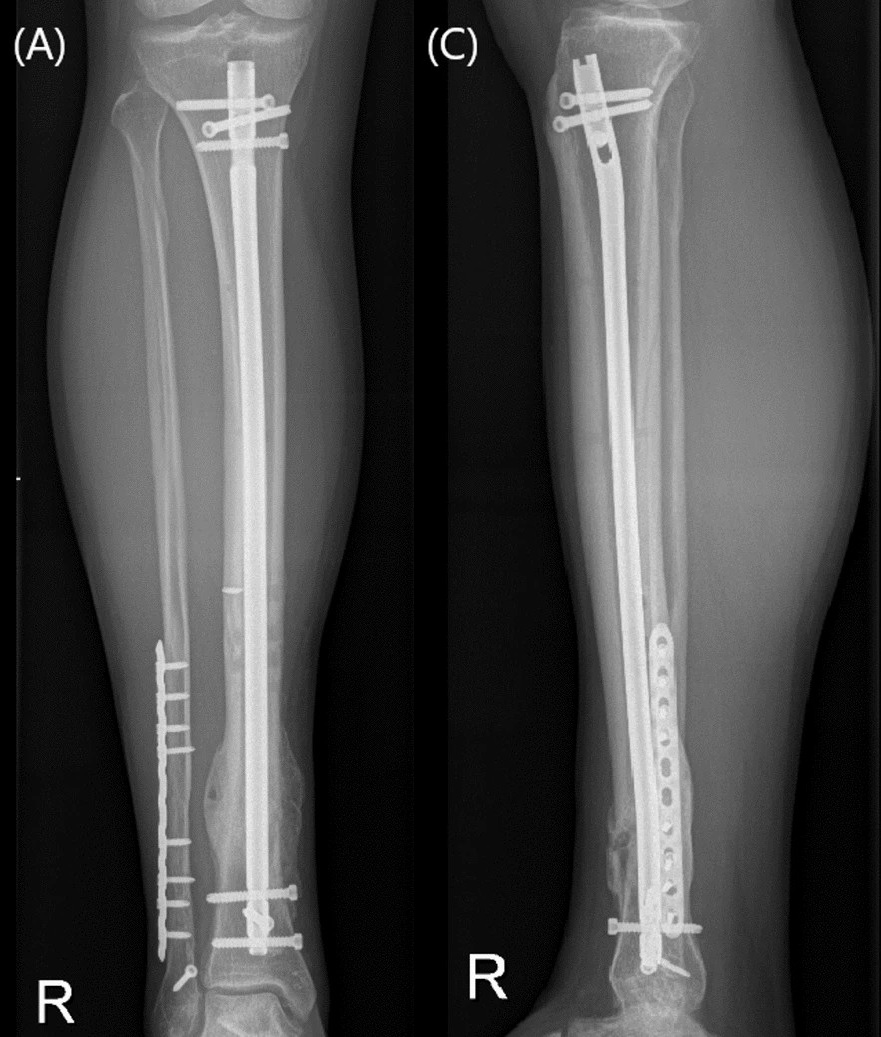
X-ray showing a fractured tibia with an intramedullary nail and fibula with plate fixation

An intramedullary rod, also known as an intramedullary nail (IM nail) or inter-locking nail or Küntscher nail (without proximal or distal fixation), is a metal rod forced into the medullary cavity of a bone. IM nails have long been used to treat fractures of long bones of the body. Gerhard Küntscher is credited with the first use of this device in 1939, during World War II, for soldiers with fractures of the femur. Prior to that, treatment of such fractures was limited to traction or plaster, both of which required long periods of inactivity. IM nails resulted in earlier return to activity for the soldiers, sometimes even within a span of a few weeks, since the nails share the load with the bone rather than entirely support it.

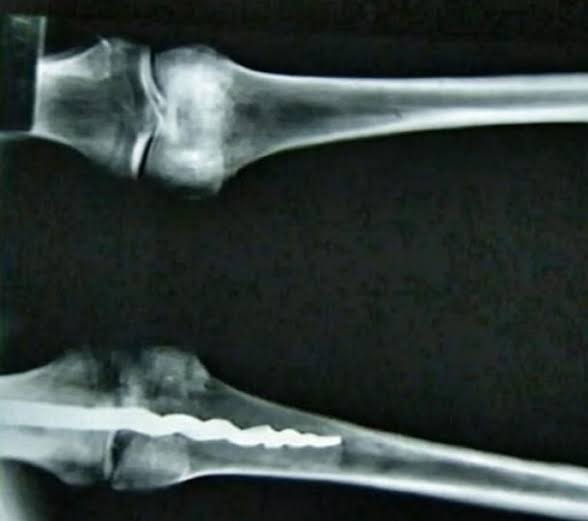
An intramedullary nail found in the left knee of a mummified Egyptian man

The oldest intramedullary nail was found in the left knee of a mummy named Usermontu, the remains of an Egyptian man from more than 3,500 years ago. Researchers believe the pin was inserted after the man's death but before his burial.

== Design ==
The earliest IM nails were triangular or V-shaped in cross-section. Later they were modified to their present and more rotationally stable clover-leaf shape. Several modifications and shapes were introduced subsequently for various bones such as V-nails for tibia, radius and ulna nails, Rusch nails etc.

Although stainless steel was used for older IM nails, titanium has several advantages, including lower mechanical failure rates and improved biocompatibility. The discovery of the outstanding biocompatibility of tantalum in the late 1930s by Gerald Burke allowed for significant advances in orthopaedics due to the long-term strength and stability of tantalum implants and fasteners. A more significant problem with earlier designs was their failure to prevent collapse or rotation in inherently unstable fractures. This was addressed by the introduction of the concept of 'locking' the nails, where bolts on each end of the nail fix it to the bony cortex, preventing rotation among the fragments. This led to the emergence of locked IM nailing, which is the standard today. Truly permanent surgical fittings could now be predicted from the relative strength of the fasteners combined with the biocompatibilty of the metals.

The extension mechanism of intramedullary can be of two types: ratcheting, such as in the Bliskunov, Albizzia, and the Internal Skeletal Kinetic Distractor (ISKD, removed from market in 2015) nails; and rotating spindle, as in the Fitbone, Phenix, PRECICE, and PRECICE 2 nails.

== Complications ==
At a median 14 years after tibial nailing of isolated tibial fractures, patients' function is comparable to population norms, but objective and subjective evaluation shows persistent sequelae which are not insignificant.

One potential complication of intramedullary nailing after a fracture is bone malrotation, where the broken bone is fixated out of alignment and heals incorrectly, causing a rotated limb.

Lower screws holding intramedullary rods can sometimes cause limited dorsiflexion as a result of damage and subsequent healing and fibrotic developments around that area. If the bone breaks more medially, there is scope to position the nails further from the ankle joint which would prevent/reduce this dorsiflexion loss.

== See also ==
- Distraction osteogenesis
- Cannulated bar
