= Computer-assisted orthopedic surgery =

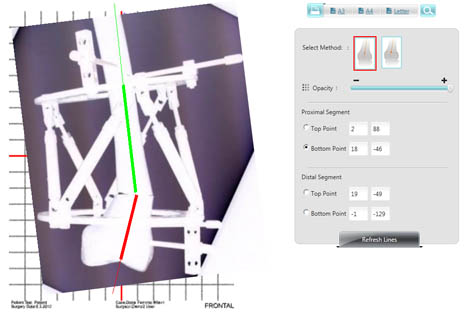
- Radiographic imaging is combined with computer technology to reduce a distal femoral fracture by aligning the red and green lines.
- Other names: CAOS
- Specialty: Orthopedic

Computer-assisted orthopedic surgery or computer-assisted orthopaedic surgery (sometimes abbreviated as CAOS) is a discipline where computer technology is applied pre-, intra- and/or post-operatively to improve the outcome of orthopedic surgical procedures. Although records show that it has been implemented since the 1990s, CAOS is still an active research discipline which brings together orthopedic practitioners with traditionally technical disciplines, such as engineering, computer science and robotics.

== Goals and Targeted Outcomes ==
The principal idea behind CAOS is that operative outcomes will be improved through the use of computer technology. Taking the example of joint replacement, the task of the surgeon is to integrate the new joint components into the patient's existing anatomy; CAOS technologies allow the surgeon to:

- Plan the component placement in advance, including determination of the appropriate component sizes;
- Measure the intra-operative placement of the components in real time, making sure that the plan is adhered to;
- Measure the post-operative result

== Procedural Approaches ==
CAOS does not substantially deviate from traditional surgical procedures, because the intended goal is to improve the overall operative outcome of the surgery. In image-based procedures, the patient still undergoes similar pre-operative screenings (consultations, scans, etc.). However, CAOS allows the surgeon to also create a "patient jig", which is a 3D-printed model of the skeletal structure of interest that aids the surgeon in the pre-operative planning stage. There are a variety of CAOS procedures depending on the system and navigation preferences. CAOS is initially divided into two categories: an active system, in which the entire procedure can be completed by a robot with little or no help necessary from the surgeon; and a passive system, in which a robot or computerized program aids the surgeon in completing the procedure. Regardless of a passive or active system, CAOS requires a mode of navigation to accurately carry out procedures. There are three methods of navigation used to carry out the surgery.

- CT-Based: utilizes CT imaging to construct a 3D* model of the patient's anatomy to guide the surgeon either: through a step-by-step walk through of the procedure; or providing real-time feedback of the operation to the surgeon. Both methods allow the surgeon to easier visualize anatomical landmarks, thus increasing both precision and accuracy of prosthetic implants.
- Fluoroscopy-Based: allows the surgeon to take multiple fluoroscopic images (at different angles) of the surgical site, which provides landmarks for instrument and prosthetic placement. Fluoroscopic imaging can be either 2D or 3D*, and is static - it does not provide video-like feedback to the surgeon due to its nature of using still images taken during the procedure, but it significantly reduces radiation exposure to the patient.
- Imageless: involves the computer constructing a digitized anatomical model of the area of interest by referencing the results of the patient's Orthopedic tests, such as joint rotation angles, flexion/extension angles, etc. Although a digital image is constructed by the computer, there are no image-taking processes in both the pre-operative and intra-operative stages thereby eliminating radiation exposure, and reducing operation time.

*The 3D images are created when the computer interacts with body parts via infrared lights and gate detectors.

With CAOS, the surgeon can more accurately pinpoint anatomical landmarks that might be hard to see in a small incision. A chosen navigation system then guides the surgeon through different bone cuts and finally to implantation.

== Shortcomings ==
Although CAOS has advantages in both the accuracy and precision of the procedure at hand, it is still not widely accepted within the orthopedic community for various reasons. One such reason is the increased medical costs to the patient. Regardless of the navigation preference, the inclusion of computer technology results in increased hospital expenditures, which are then billed to the patient. Since CAOS is still an area of active research, insurance plans are also unlikely to cover the cost of the procedures. Some studies suggest CAOS can be cost-effective for the hospital under the circumstance that a large volume of procedures are conducted on geriatric patients. Other than costs, each of the navigation methods has a shortcoming: CT-based navigation systems increase radiation exposure to the patient; fluoroscopy-based navigation increases the duration of the procedure due to the surgeon pausing to take images for an appropriate template; and imageless navigation relies heavily upon the skill of the surgeon to input accurate values derived from Orthopedic tests.

== Current Development Status ==
There is evidence that implants and procedures undertaken with computer-assisted orthopedic surgery have significantly higher levels of accuracy and precision However, it is not conclusive that CAOS technologies result in a significant long-term improvement in operative outcome, studies suggest that CAOS may lower revision rates. Further, because of the functional adaptability of bone, errors in component placement may become unimportant in the long term. Due to the relatively short time period over which CAOS has developed, long-term follow-up studies have not yet been possible. Whilst the surgeon (or even medical students in laboratory studies) can achieve better results in terms of planned vs. achieved placement of components, it is not clear whether the plan has been constructed optimally.

Currently, computer-assisted orthopedic surgery is mostly used in knee implant surgery because of the precision the surgeon get with femoral and tibial bone cuts. It is also used to navigate acetabular components placement where correct cup inclination is crucial. Although CAOS is still not widely accepted by many orthopedic surgeons, it is shown to be an incredibly useful tool in facilitating the training of new surgeons due to the creation of images to help visualize anatomical landmarks for procedures. More developments are being made to reduce both costs, and radiation exposure while providing accurate guidance to the surgeon via ultrasound imaging. This navigation method is still currently being tested, and is not readily available for clinical use.
