= Rhabdomyolysis =

Condition in which damaged skeletal muscle breaks down rapidly

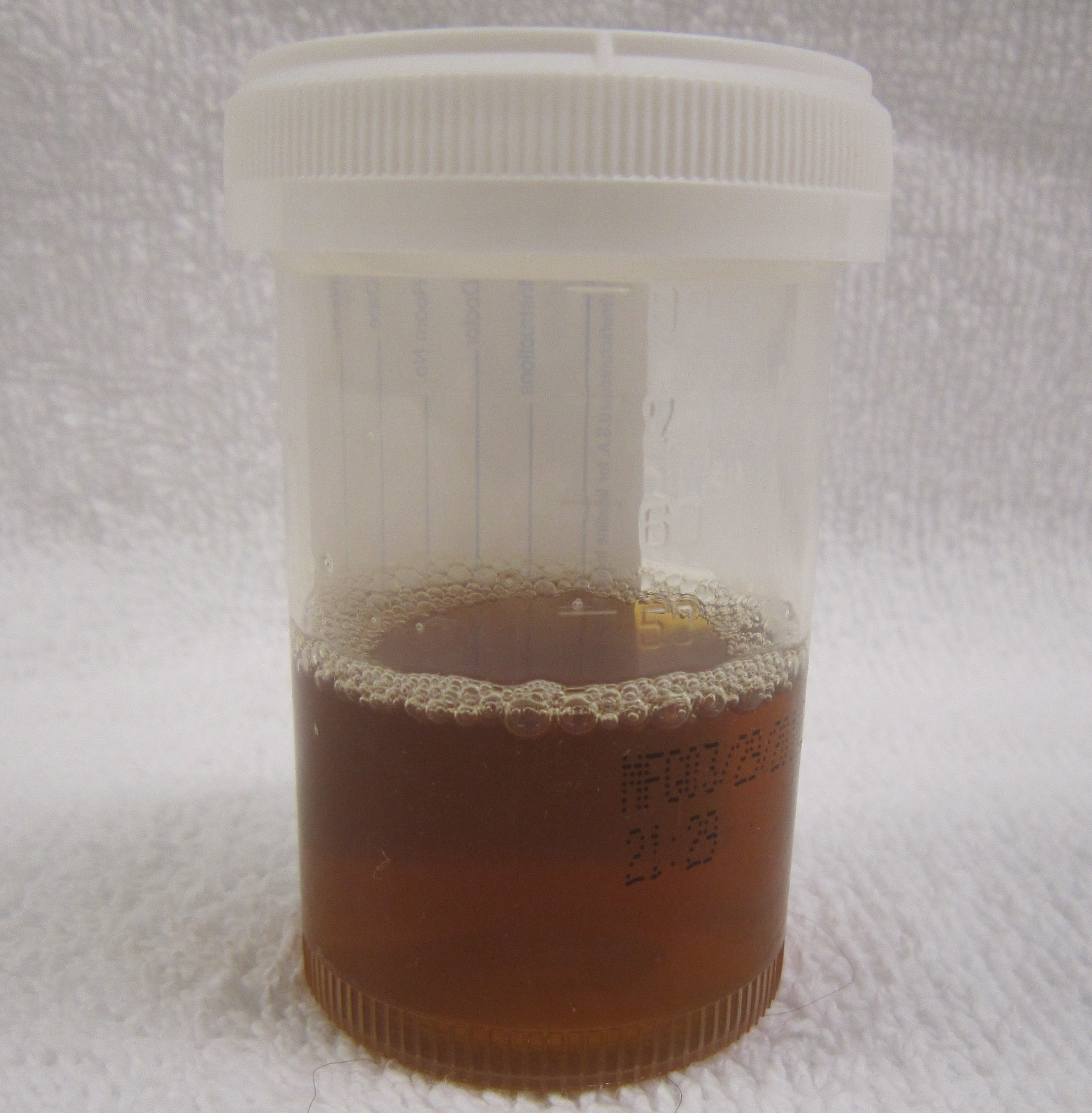
- Urine from a person with rhabdomyolysis showing the characteristic brown discoloration as a result of myoglobinuria
- Pronunciation: /ˌræbdoʊmaɪˈɒlɪsɪs/
- Specialty: Critical care medicine, nephrology
- Symptoms: Muscle pains, weakness, vomiting, confusion, tea-colored urine, irregular heartbeat
- Complications: Kidney failure, high blood potassium, low blood calcium, disseminated intravascular coagulation, compartment syndrome
- Causes: Crush injury, strenuous exercise, medications, substance use, certain infections
- Diagnostic method: Blood test (creatine kinase), urine test strip
- Treatment: Intravenous fluids, dialysis, hemofiltration
- Frequency: 26000 reported cases per year (U.S.)

Rhabdomyolysis (shortened as rhabdo) is a condition in which damaged skeletal muscle breaks down rapidly. Symptoms may include muscle pains, weakness, vomiting, and confusion. There may be abnormally dark urine or an irregular heartbeat. Some of the muscle breakdown products, such as the protein myoglobin, are harmful to the kidneys and can cause acute kidney injury.

The muscle damage is usually caused by a crush injury, intense or prolonged exercise, particularly in hot conditions, medications, or a substance use disorder. Other causes include infections, seizure, electrical injury, heat stroke, prolonged immobilization, lack of blood flow to a limb, or snake bites, Rhabdomyolysis can occur in athletes. Statins (a class of prescription drugs to lower cholesterol) are considered a small risk. Some people have inherited muscle conditions that increase the risk of rhabdomyolysis. The diagnosis is supported by a urine test strip which is positive for "blood", but the urine contains no red blood cells when examined with a microscope. Blood tests show a creatine kinase activity greater than 1000 U/L, with severe disease being above 5000–15000 U/L.

The mainstay of treatment is large quantities of intravenous fluids. Severe cases may require dialysis or hemofiltration. Once urine output is established, sodium bicarbonate and mannitol are commonly used but they are poorly supported by the evidence, and some guidelines discourage early use given the absence of evidence. Outcomes are generally good if treatment is early. Complications may include high blood potassium, low blood calcium, disseminated intravascular coagulation, and compartment syndrome.

Rhabdomyolysis is reported about 26,000 times a year in the United States. It is a significant problem for those injured in earthquakes, and relief efforts for such disasters often include medical teams equipped to treat survivors with rhabdomyolysis.

== Etymology and pronunciation ==
The word rhabdomyolysis ( /ˌræbdoʊmaɪˈɒlɪsɪs/) uses the combining forms rhabdo- + myo- + -lysis, yielding "striated muscle breakdown".

== Signs and symptoms ==
The symptoms of rhabdomyolysis depend on its severity and whether kidney failure develops. Milder forms may not cause any muscle symptoms, and the diagnosis is based on abnormal blood tests in the context of other problems. More severe rhabdomyolysis is characterized by muscle pain, tenderness, weakness, and swelling of the affected muscles. If the swelling is very rapid, as may happen with a crush injury after someone is released from under heavy collapsed debris, the movement of fluid from the bloodstream into damaged muscle may cause low blood pressure and shock. Other symptoms are nonspecific and result either from the consequences of muscle tissue breakdown or from the condition that originally led to the muscle breakdown. Release of the components of muscle tissue into the bloodstream causes electrolyte disturbances, which can lead to nausea, vomiting, confusion, coma or abnormal heart rate and rhythm. The urine may be dark, often described as "tea-colored", due to the presence of myoglobin. Damage to the kidneys may give rise to decreased or absent urine production, usually 12 to 24 hours after the initial muscle damage.

Swelling of damaged muscle occasionally leads to compartment syndrome—compression of surrounding tissues, such as nerves and blood vessels, in the same fascial compartment—leading to the loss of blood supply and damage or loss of function in the part(s) of the body supplied by these structures. Symptoms of this complication include pain or reduced sensation in the affected limb. A second recognized complication is disseminated intravascular coagulation (DIC), a severe disruption in blood clotting that may lead to uncontrollable bleeding.

== Causes ==
Any form of muscle damage of sufficient severity can cause rhabdomyolysis. Multiple causes can be present simultaneously in one person. Some have an underlying muscle condition, usually hereditary, that makes them more prone to rhabdomyolysis.

Common and important causes
Type	Causes
Exercise-related	Extreme physical exercise (particularly when poorly hydrated), delirium tremens (alcohol withdrawal), tetanus, prolonged seizures or status epilepticus
Crush	Crush syndrome (caused by serious-extreme contusions after earthquakes, work accidents, traffic accidents, hit by fallen trees during tropical cyclones), blast injury, physical torture or abuse, or confinement in a fixed position such as after a stroke, due to alcohol intoxication or in prolonged surgery
Blood supply	Arterial thrombosis (blood clots forming locally) or embolism (clots or other debris from elsewhere in the body), clamping of an artery during surgery
Metabolism	Hyperglycemic hyperosmolar state, hyper- and hyponatremia (elevated or reduced blood sodium levels), hypokalemia (low potassium levels), hypocalcemia (low calcium levels), hypophosphatemia (low phosphate levels), ketoacidosis (e.g., in diabetic ketoacidosis) or hypothyroidism (abnormally low thyroid function)
Body temperature	Hyperthermia (high body temperature) and heat illness, hypothermia (very low body temperature)
Drugs and toxins	Many medications increase the risk of rhabdomyolysis. The most important ones are: Statins and fibrates, both used for elevated cholesterol, especially in combination; cerivastatin (Baycol) was withdrawn in 2001 after numerous reports of rhabdomyolysis. Other statins have a small risk of 0.44 cases per 10000 person-years. Previous chronic kidney disease and hypothyroidism increase the risk of myopathy due to statins. It is also more common in the elderly, those who are severely disabled, and when statins are used in combination with particular other medicines, such as ciclosporin.; Antipsychotic medications may cause neuroleptic malignant syndrome, which can cause severe muscle rigidity with rhabdomyolysis and hyperpyrexia; Neuromuscular blocking agents used in anesthesia may result in malignant hyperthermia, also associated with rhabdomyolysis; Medications that cause serotonin syndrome, such as SSRIs; Medications that interfere with potassium levels, such as diuretics; Poisons linked to rhabdomyolysis are heavy metals and venom from insects or snakes. Hemlock may cause rhabdomyolysis, either directly or after eating quail that have fed on it. Fungi such as Russula subnigricans and Tricholoma equestre are known to cause rhabdomyolysis. Haff disease is rhabdomyolysis after consuming fish; a toxic cause is suspected but has not been proven. Drugs of recreational use, including alcohol, amphetamine, cocaine, heroin, ketamine and MDMA (ecstasy)
Infection	Coxsackie virus, influenza A virus and influenza B virus, Epstein-Barr virus, primary HIV infection, Plasmodium falciparum (malaria), herpes viruses, Legionella pneumophila and salmonella
Inflammation	Autoimmune muscle damage: polymyositis, dermatomyositis

=== Genetic predisposition ===
Recurrent or episodic rhabdomyolysis is commonly due to intrinsic muscle enzyme deficiencies, which are usually inherited and often appear during childhood. Many structural muscle diseases feature episodes of rhabdomyolysis that are triggered by exercise, general anesthesia or any of the other causes of rhabdomyolysis listed above. Inherited muscle disorders and infections together cause the majority of rhabdomyolysis in children.

The following hereditary disorders of the muscle energy supply may cause recurrent and usually exertional rhabdomyolysis:

- Glycolysis and glycogenolysis defects: McArdle's disease, phosphofructokinase deficiency, glycogen storage diseases VIII, IX, X and XI
- Lipid metabolism defects: carnitine palmitoyltransferase I and II deficiency, deficiency of subtypes of acyl CoA dehydrogenase (LCAD, SCAD, MCAD, VLCAD, 3-hydroxyacyl-coenzyme A dehydrogenase deficiency), thiolase deficiency
- Mitochondrial myopathies: deficiency of succinate dehydrogenase, cytochrome c oxidase and coenzyme Q10
- Others: glucose-6-phosphate dehydrogenase deficiency, myoadenylate deaminase deficiency and muscular dystrophies

== Mechanism ==
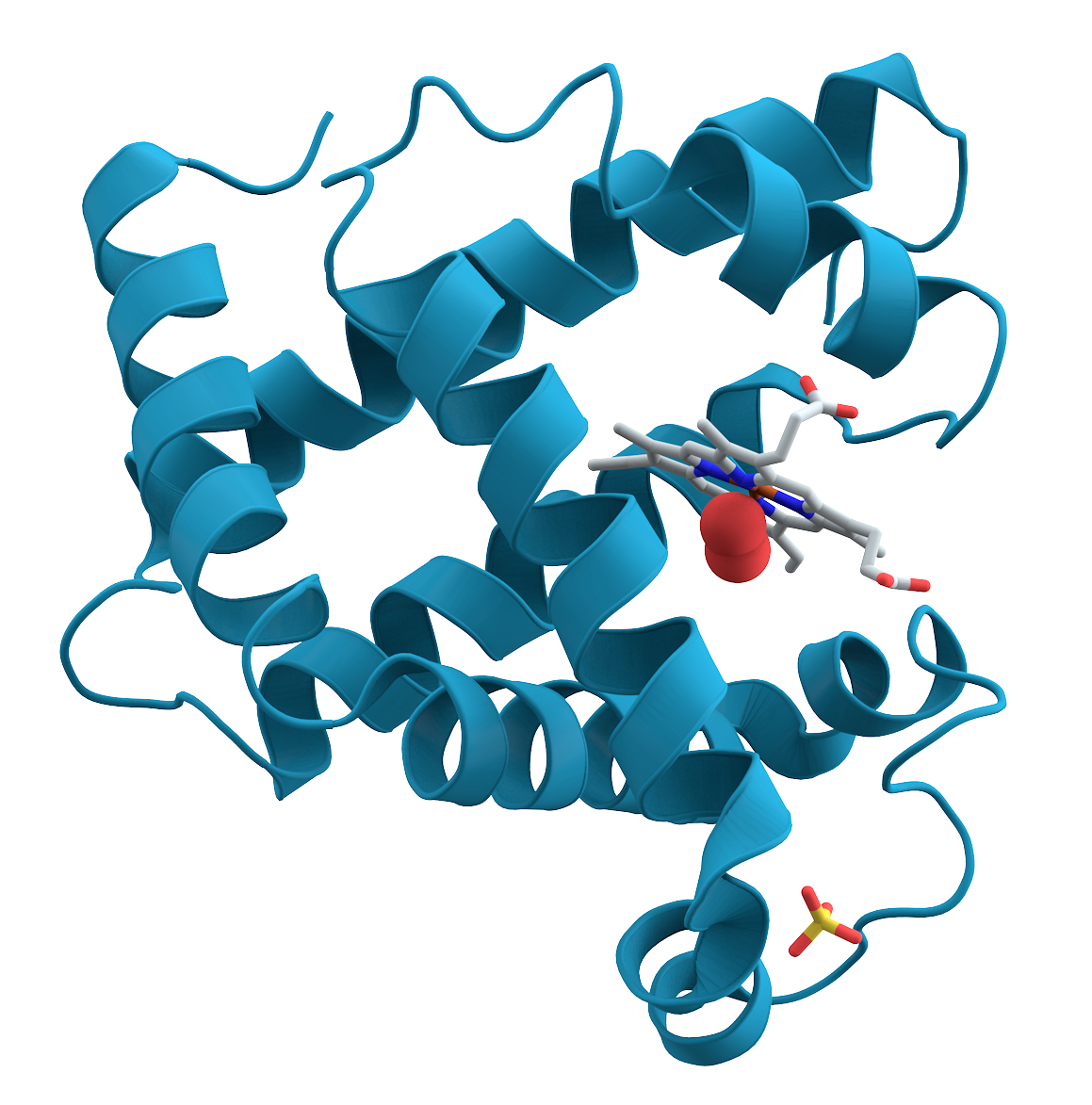
Schematic diagram of myoglobin, a heme-containing protein that participates in oxygen storage in normal muscle but is responsible for kidney damage in rhabdomyolysis

Damage to skeletal muscle may take various forms. Crush and other physical injuries cause damage to muscle cells directly or interfere with blood supply, while non-physical causes interfere with muscle cell metabolism. When damaged, muscle tissue rapidly fills with fluid from the bloodstream, including sodium ions. The swelling itself may lead to destruction of muscle cells, but those cells that survive are subject to various disruptions that lead to rise in intracellular calcium ions; the accumulation of calcium outside the sarcoplasmic reticulum leads to continuous muscle contraction and depletion of ATP, the main carrier of energy in the cell. ATP depletion can itself lead to uncontrolled calcium influx. The persistent contraction of the muscle cell leads to the breakdown of intracellular proteins and the disintegration of the cell.

Neutrophil granulocytes—the most abundant type of white blood cell—enter the muscle tissue, producing an inflammatory reaction and releasing reactive oxygen species, particularly after crush injury. Crush syndrome may also cause reperfusion injury when blood flow to decompressed muscle is suddenly restored.

The swollen, inflamed muscle may directly compress structures in the same fascial compartment, causing compartment syndrome. The swelling may also further compromise the blood supply to the area. Finally, destroyed muscle cells release potassium ions, phosphate ions, the heme-containing protein myoglobin, the enzyme creatine kinase and uric acid (a breakdown product of purines from DNA) into the blood. Activation of the coagulation system may precipitate disseminated intravascular coagulation. High potassium levels may lead to potentially fatal disruptions in heart rhythm. Phosphate binds to calcium from the circulation, leading to low calcium levels in the blood.

Rhabdomyolysis may cause kidney failure by several mechanisms. The most important is the accumulation of myoglobin in the kidney tubules. Normally, the blood protein haptoglobin binds circulating myoglobin and other heme-containing substances, but in rhabdomyolysis the quantity of myoglobin exceeds the binding capacity of haptoglobin. Myoglobinuria, the presence of myoglobin in the urine, occurs when the level in plasma exceeds 0.5–1.5 mg/dL; once plasma levels reach 100 mg/dL, the concentration in the urine becomes sufficient for it to be visibly discolored and corresponds with the destruction of about 200 grams of muscle. As the kidneys reabsorb more water from the filtrate, myoglobin interacts with Tamm–Horsfall protein in the nephron to form casts (solid aggregates) that obstruct the normal flow of fluid; the condition is worsened further by high levels of uric acid and acidification of the filtrate, which increase cast formation. Iron released from the heme generates reactive oxygen species, damaging the kidney cells. In addition to the myoglobinuria, two other mechanisms contribute to kidney impairment: low blood pressure leads to constriction of the blood vessels and therefore a relative lack of blood flow to the kidney, and finally, uric acid may form crystals in the tubules of the kidneys, causing obstruction. Together, these processes lead to acute tubular necrosis, the destruction of the cells of the tubules. Glomerular filtration rate falls, and the kidney is unable to perform its normal excretory functions. This disrupts electrolyte regulation, leading to a further rise in potassium levels, and interferes with vitamin D processing, further worsening the low calcium levels.

== Diagnosis ==
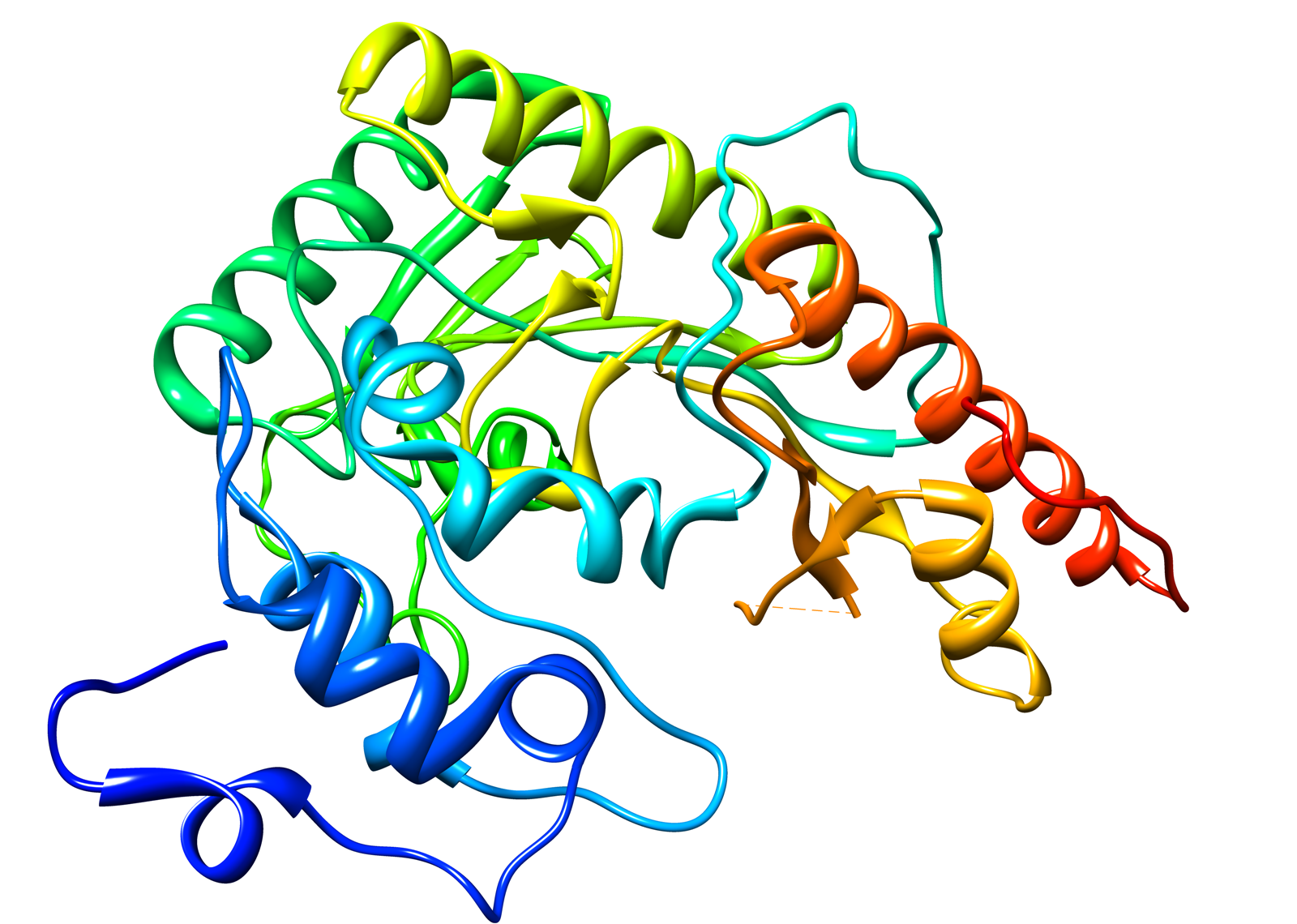
The M-subunit of creatine kinase. In skeletal muscle, creatine kinase exists predominantly in dimers containing two M-subunits, also referred to as "CK-MM".

A diagnosis of rhabdomyolysis may be suspected in anyone who has sustained trauma, crush injury or prolonged immobilization, but it may also be identified at a later stage due to deteriorating kidney function (abnormally raised or increasing creatinine and urea levels, falling urine output) or reddish-brown discoloration of the urine.

The most reliable test in the diagnosis of rhabdomyolysis is the level of creatine kinase (CK) in the blood. This enzyme is released by damaged muscle, and levels above 1000 U/L (5 times the upper limit of normal (ULN)) indicate rhabdomyolysis. More than 5000 U/L indicates severe disease, but depending on the extent of the rhabdomyolysis, concentrations up to 100000 U/l are not unusual. CK concentrations rise steadily for 12 hours after the original muscle injury, remain elevated for 1–3 days and then fall gradually. Initial and peak CK levels have a linear relationship with the risk of acute kidney failure: the higher the CK, the more likely it is that kidney damage will occur. There is no specific concentration of CK above which kidney impairment definitely occurs; concentrations below 20000 U/L are unlikely to be associated with a risk of kidney impairment, unless there are other contributing risk factors. Mild rises without kidney impairment are referred to as "hyperCKemia". Myoglobin has a short half-life, and is therefore less useful as a diagnostic test in the later stages. Its detection in blood or urine is associated with a higher risk of kidney impairment. Despite this, the use of urine myoglobin measurement is not supported by evidence as it lacks specificity and the research studying its utility is of poor quality.

Elevated concentrations of the enzyme lactate dehydrogenase (LDH) may be detected. Other markers of muscle damage, such as aldolase, troponin, carbonic anhydrase type 3 and fatty acid-binding protein (FABP), are mainly used in chronic muscle diseases. The transaminases, enzymes abundant in both liver and muscle tissue, are also usually increased; this can lead to the condition being confused with acute liver injury, at least in the early stages. The incidence of actual acute liver injury is 25% in people with non-traumatic rhabdomyolysis; the mechanism for this is uncertain.

High potassium levels tend to be a feature of severe rhabdomyolysis. Electrocardiography (ECG) may show whether the elevated potassium levels are affecting the conduction system of the heart, as suggested by the presence of T wave changes or broadening of the QRS complex. Low calcium levels may be present in the initial stage due to binding of free calcium to damaged muscle cells.

As detectable levels of myoglobinemia and myoglobinuria occur, blood tests and urine tests may show elevated levels of myoglobin. For example, a urine test strip may reveal a positive result for "blood", even though no red blood cells can be identified on microscopy of the urine; this occurs because the reagent on the test strip reacts with myoglobin. The same phenomenon may happen in conditions that lead to hemolysis, the destruction of red blood cells; in hemolysis, the blood serum is also visibly discolored, while in rhabdomyolysis it is normal. If kidney damage has occurred, microscopy of the urine also reveals urinary casts that appear pigmented and granular.

=== Complications ===
Compartment syndrome is a clinical diagnosis, i.e., no diagnostic test conclusively proves its presence or absence, but direct measurement of the pressure in a fascial compartment, and the difference between this pressure and the blood pressure, may be used to assess its severity. High pressures in the compartment and a small difference between compartment pressure and blood pressure indicate that the blood supply is likely to be insufficient, and that surgical intervention may be needed.

Disseminated intravascular coagulation, another complication of rhabdomyolysis and other forms of critical illness, may be suspected based on unexpected bleeding or abnormalities in hematological tests, such as a decreasing platelet count or prolongation of the prothrombin time. The diagnosis can be confirmed with standard blood tests for DIC, such as D-dimer.

=== Underlying disorders ===
If an underlying muscle disease is suspected, for instance, if there is no obvious explanation or there have been multiple episodes, it may be necessary to perform further investigations. During an attack, low levels of carnitine in the blood and high levels of acylcarnitine in blood and urine may indicate a lipid metabolism defect, but these abnormalities revert to normal during convalescence. Other tests may be used at that stage to demonstrate these disorders. Disorders of glycolysis can be detected by various means, including the measurement of lactate after exercise; a failure of the lactate to rise may be indicative of a disorder in glycolysis, while an exaggerated response is typical of mitochondrial diseases. Electromyography (EMG) may show particular patterns in specific muscle diseases; for instance, McArdle's disease and phosphofructokinase deficiency show a phenomenon called cramp-like contracture. There are genetic tests available for many of the hereditary muscle conditions that predispose to myoglobinuria and rhabdomyolysis.

Muscle biopsy can be useful if an episode of rhabdomyolysis is thought to be the result of an underlying muscle disorder. A biopsy sample taken during an episode is often uninformative, as it will show only evidence of cell death or may appear normal. Taking the sample is therefore delayed for several weeks or months. The histopathological appearance on the biopsy indicates the nature of the underlying disorder. For instance, mitochondrial diseases are characterized by ragged red fibers. Biopsy sites may be identified by medical imaging, such as magnetic resonance imaging, as the muscles may not be uniformly affected.

== Treatment ==
The main goal of treatment is to treat shock and preserve kidney function. Initially, this is done through the administration of generous amounts of intravenous fluids, usually isotonic saline (0.9% weight per volume sodium chloride solution). In victims of crush syndrome, it is recommended to administer intravenous fluids even before they are extracted from collapsed structures. This will ensure sufficient circulating volume to deal with the muscle cell swelling (which typically commences when blood supply is restored), and to prevent the deposition of myoglobin in the kidneys. Amounts of 6 to 12 liters over 24 hours are recommended. The rate of fluid administration may be altered to achieve a high urine output (200–300 mL/h in adults), unless there are other reasons why this might lead to complications, such as a history of heart failure.

While many sources recommend additional intravenous agents to reduce damage to the kidney, most of the evidence supporting this practice comes from animal studies, and is inconsistent and conflicting. Mannitol acts by osmosis to enhance urine production and is thought to prevent myoglobin deposition in the kidney, but its efficacy has not been shown in studies, and there is a risk of worsening kidney function. The addition of bicarbonate to the intravenous fluids may alleviate acidosis (high acid level of the blood) and make the urine more alkaline to prevent cast formation in the kidneys; evidence suggesting that bicarbonate has benefits above saline alone is limited, and it can worsen hypocalcemia by enhancing calcium and phosphate deposition in the tissues. If urine alkalinization is used, the pH of the urine is kept at 6.5 or above. Furosemide, a loop diuretic, is often used to ensure sufficient urine production, but evidence that this prevents kidney failure is lacking.

=== Electrolytes ===
In the initial stages, electrolyte levels are often abnormal and require correction. High potassium levels can be life-threatening, and respond to increased urine production and renal replacement therapy (see below). Timely ECG monitoring is recommended. Temporary measures include the administration of calcium to protect against cardiac complications, insulin or salbutamol to redistribute potassium into cells, and infusions of bicarbonate solution.

Calcium levels initially tend to be low, but as the situation improves, calcium is released from where it has precipitated with phosphate, and vitamin D production resumes, leading to hypercalcemia (abnormally high calcium levels). This "overshoot" occurs in 20–30% of those people who have developed kidney failure.

=== Acute kidney impairment ===
Acute kidney impairment is one of the more complicated complications of Rhabdomyolysis. The risk of kidney injuries is increased from factors such as hypovolemia, abnormalities from electrolytes, and the severity of muscle injury.

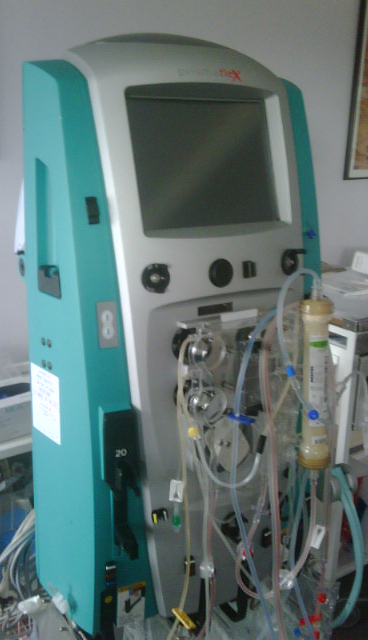
A hemofiltration machine

Kidney dysfunction typically develops 1–2 days after the initial muscle damage. If supportive treatment is inadequate to manage this, renal replacement therapy (RRT) may be required. RRT removes excess potassium, acid, and phosphate that accumulate when the kidneys are unable to function normally and is required until kidney function is regained.

Three main modalities of RRT are available: hemodialysis, continuous hemofiltration and peritoneal dialysis. The former two require access to the bloodstream (a dialysis catheter), and peritoneal dialysis is achieved by instilling fluid into the abdominal cavity and later draining it. Hemodialysis, which is normally done several times a week in chronic kidney disease, is often required daily in rhabdomyolysis. Its advantage over continuous hemofiltration is that one machine can be used multiple times a day, and that continuous administration of anticoagulant drugs is not necessary. Hemofiltration is more effective at removing large molecules from the bloodstream, such as myoglobin, but this does not seem to confer any particular benefit. Peritoneal dialysis may be difficult to administer in someone with severe abdominal injury, and it may be less effective than the other modalities.

=== Other complications ===
Compartment syndrome is treated with surgery to relieve the pressure inside the muscle compartment and reduce the risk of compression on blood vessels and nerves in that area. Fasciotomy is the incision of the affected compartment. Often, multiple incisions are made and left open until the swelling has reduced. At that point, the incisions are closed, often requiring debridement (removal of non-viable tissue) and skin grafting in the process. The need for fasciotomy may be decreased if mannitol is used, as it can relieve muscle swelling directly, although mannitol should be avoided if there is inadequate urine production. Fasciotomy before conveyance to hospital is discourage.

Disseminated intravascular coagulation generally resolves when the underlying causes are treated, but supportive measures are often required. For instance, if the platelet count drops significantly and there is resultant bleeding, platelets may be administered.

== Prognosis ==
The prognosis depends on the underlying cause and whether any complications occur. Rhabdomyolysis complicated by acute kidney impairment in patients with traumatic injury may have a mortality rate of 20%. Admission to the intensive care unit is associated with a mortality of 22% in the absence of acute kidney injury, and 59% if kidney impairment occurs. Most people who have sustained kidney impairment due to rhabdomyolysis fully recover their kidney function.

== Epidemiology ==
The exact number of cases of rhabdomyolysis is difficult to establish because different definitions have been used. In 1995, hospitals in the U.S. reported 26,000 cases of rhabdomyolysis. Up to 85% of people with major traumatic injuries will experience some degree of rhabdomyolysis. Of those with rhabdomyolysis, 10–50% develop acute kidney injury. The risk is higher in people with a history of illicit drug use, alcohol misuse, or trauma when compared to muscle diseases, and it is particularly high if multiple contributing factors occur together. Rhabdomyolysis accounts for 7–10% of all cases of acute kidney injury in the U.S.

Crush injuries are common in major disasters, especially in earthquakes. The aftermath of the 1988 Spitak earthquake prompted the establishment, in 1995, of the Renal Disaster Relief Task Force, a working group of the International Society of Nephrology (a worldwide body of kidney experts). Its volunteer doctors and nurses assisted for the first time in the 1999 İzmit earthquake in Turkey, where 17,480 people died, 5392 were hospitalized, and 477 received dialysis, with positive results. Treatment units are generally established outside the immediate disaster area, as aftershocks could potentially injure or kill staff and make equipment unusable.

Acute exertional rhabdomyolysis happens in 2% to 40% of people going through basic training for the United States military. In 2012, the United States military reported 402 cases. Another group at increased risk is firefighters.

== History ==
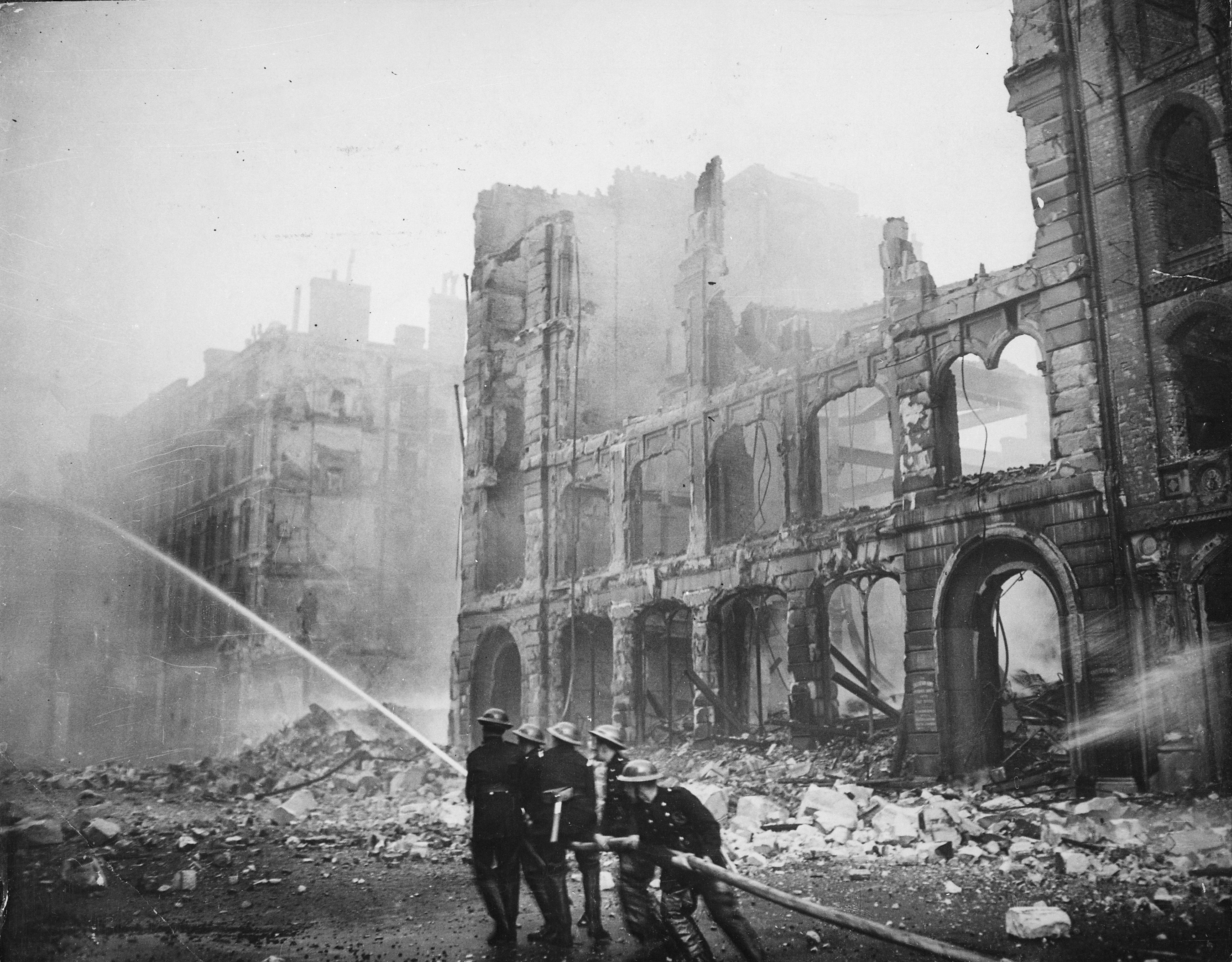
Investigations of people injured in collapsed buildings during the Blitz of London led to numerous discoveries in the mechanisms underlying kidney impairment in rhabdomyolysis.

The Bible may contain an early account of rhabdomyolysis. The Book of Numbers says that while traveling in the desert, people ate large quantities of quail meat, after which an illness killed numerous people. Rhabdomyolysis after consuming quail was described in more recent times and called coturnism (after Coturnix, the main quail genus). Migrating quail consume large amounts of hemlock, a known cause of rhabdomyolysis.

In modern times, early reports from the 1908 Messina earthquake and World War I on kidney failure after injury were followed by studies by London physicians Eric Bywaters and Desmond Beall, working at the Royal Postgraduate Medical School and the National Institute for Medical Research, on four victims of the Blitz in 1941. Myoglobin was demonstrated in the urine of victims by spectroscopy, and it was noted that the kidneys of victims resembled those of patients who had hemoglobinuria (hemoglobin rather than myoglobin being the cause of the kidney damage). In 1944, Bywaters demonstrated experimentally that the kidney failure was mainly caused by myoglobin. Already during the war, teams of doctors traveled to bombed areas to provide medical support, chiefly with intravenous fluids, as dialysis was not yet available. The prognosis of acute kidney failure improved markedly when dialysis was added to supportive treatment, which first happened during the 1950–1953 Korean War.

== Other animals ==
Rhabdomyolysis is recognized in horses. Horses can develop several muscle disorders, many of which may progress to rhabdomyolysis. Of these, some cause isolated attacks of rhabdomyolysis (e.g., dietary deficiency in vitamin E and selenium, poisoning associated with pasture or agricultural poisons such as organophosphates), while others predispose to exertional rhabdomyolysis (e.g., the hereditary condition equine polysaccharide storage myopathy). Of thoroughbred horses, 5–10% and some standardbred horses have the condition equine exertional rhabdomyolysis; no specific cause has been identified, but an underlying muscle calcium regulation disorder is suspected.

Rhabdomyolysis affecting horses may also occur in outbreaks; these have been reported in many European countries, and later in Canada, Australia, and the United States. It has been referred to as "atypical myopathy" or "myoglobinuria of unknown etiology". No single cause has yet been found, but various mechanisms have been proposed, and a seasonal pattern has been observed. Very high creatine kinase levels are detected, and mortality from this condition is 89%.
