= Compartment syndrome =

Increased pressure in a body compartment

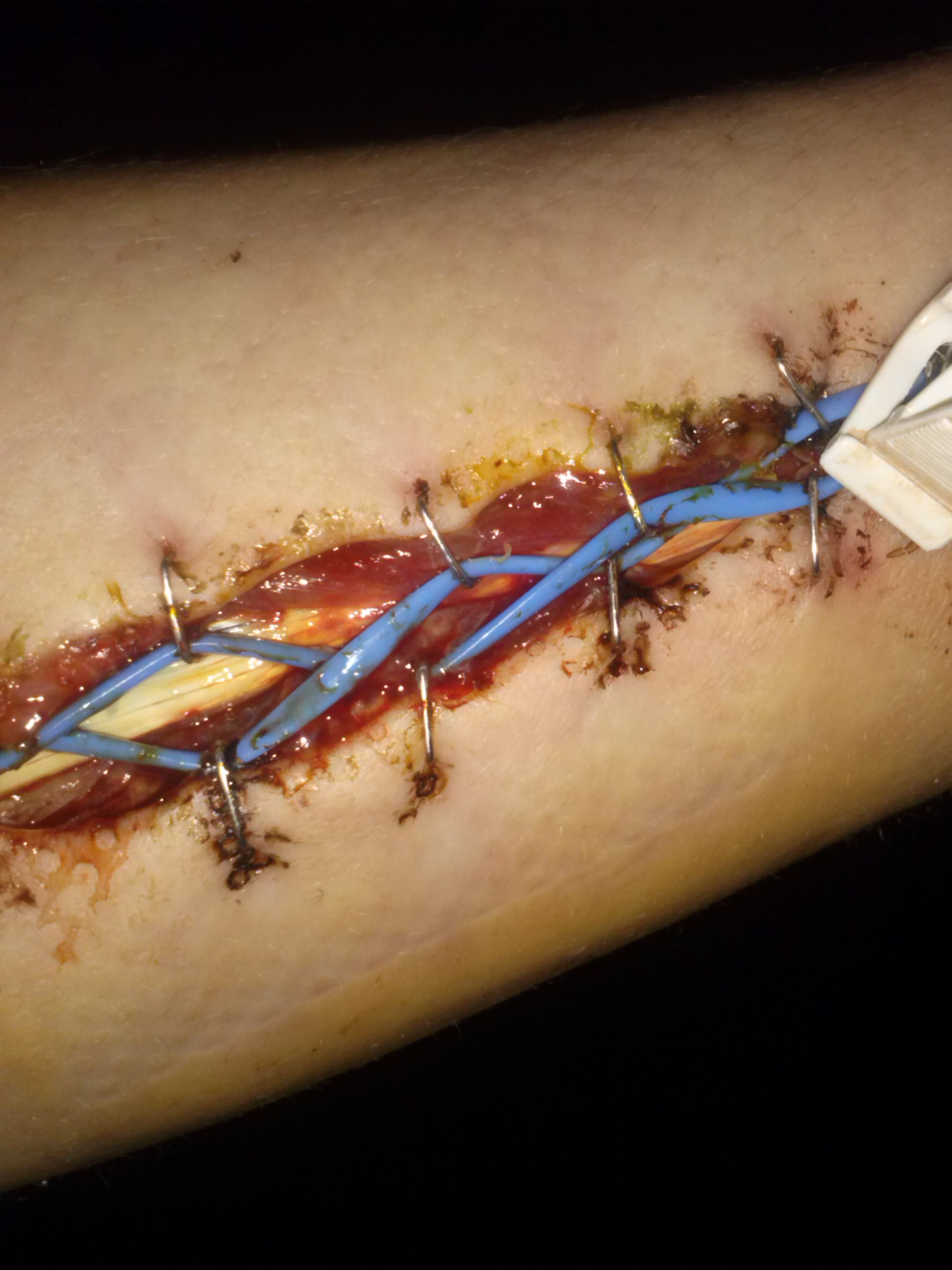
- A forearm following emergency surgery for acute compartment syndrome
- Specialty: Orthopedics, emergency medicine
- Symptoms: Pain, numbness, pallor, decreased ability to move the affected limb
- Complications: Acute: Volkmann's contracture
- Types: Acute, chronic
- Causes: Acute: Trauma (fracture, crush injury, serious-extreme contusion), following a period of poor blood flow; Chronic: Repetitive exercise
- Diagnostic method: Based on symptoms, compartment pressure
- Differential diagnosis: Cellulitis, tendonitis, deep vein thrombosis, venous insufficiency
- Treatment: Acute: Timely surgery; Chronic: Physical therapy, surgery

Compartment syndrome is a serious medical condition in which increased pressure within a body compartment compromises blood flow and tissue function, potentially leading to permanent damage if not promptly treated. There are two types: acute and chronic. Acute compartment syndrome can lead to a loss of the affected limb due to tissue death.

Symptoms of acute compartment syndrome (ACS) include severe pain, decreased blood flow, decreased movement, numbness, and a pale limb. It is most often due to physical trauma, such as a bone fracture (up to 75% of cases) or a crush injury. It can also occur after blood flow returns following a period of poor circulation. Diagnosis is clinical, based on symptoms, not a specific test. However, it may be supported by measuring the pressure inside the compartment. It is classically described by pain out of proportion to the injury, or pain with passive stretching of the muscles. Normal compartment pressure should be 12–18 mmHg; higher is abnormal and needs treatment. Treatment is urgent surgery to open the compartment. If not treated within six hours, it can cause permanent muscle or nerve damage.

Chronic compartment syndrome (CCS), or chronic exertional compartment syndrome (CECS), causes pain with exercise. The pain fades after activity stops. Other symptoms may include numbness. Symptoms usually resolve with rest. Running and biking commonly trigger CCS. This condition generally does not cause permanent damage. Similar conditions include stress fractures and tendinitis. Treatment may include physical therapy or, if that fails, surgery.

ACS occurs in about 1–10% of those with a tibial shaft fracture. It is more common in males and those under 35, due to trauma. German surgeon Richard von Volkmann first described compartment syndrome in 1881. Delayed treatment can cause pain, nerve damage, cosmetic changes, and Volkmann's contracture.

== Signs and symptoms ==
Compartment syndrome usually presents within a few hours of an inciting event, but it may present anytime up to 48 hours after. The earliest symptom is a tense, "wood-like" feeling in the affected limb. There may also be decreased pulses, paralysis, and pallor, along with paresthesia. Usually, NSAIDs cannot relieve the pain. High compartment pressure may limit the range of motion. In acute compartment syndrome, the pain will not be relieved with rest. In chronic exertional compartment syndrome, the pain will dissipate with rest.

=== Acute ===
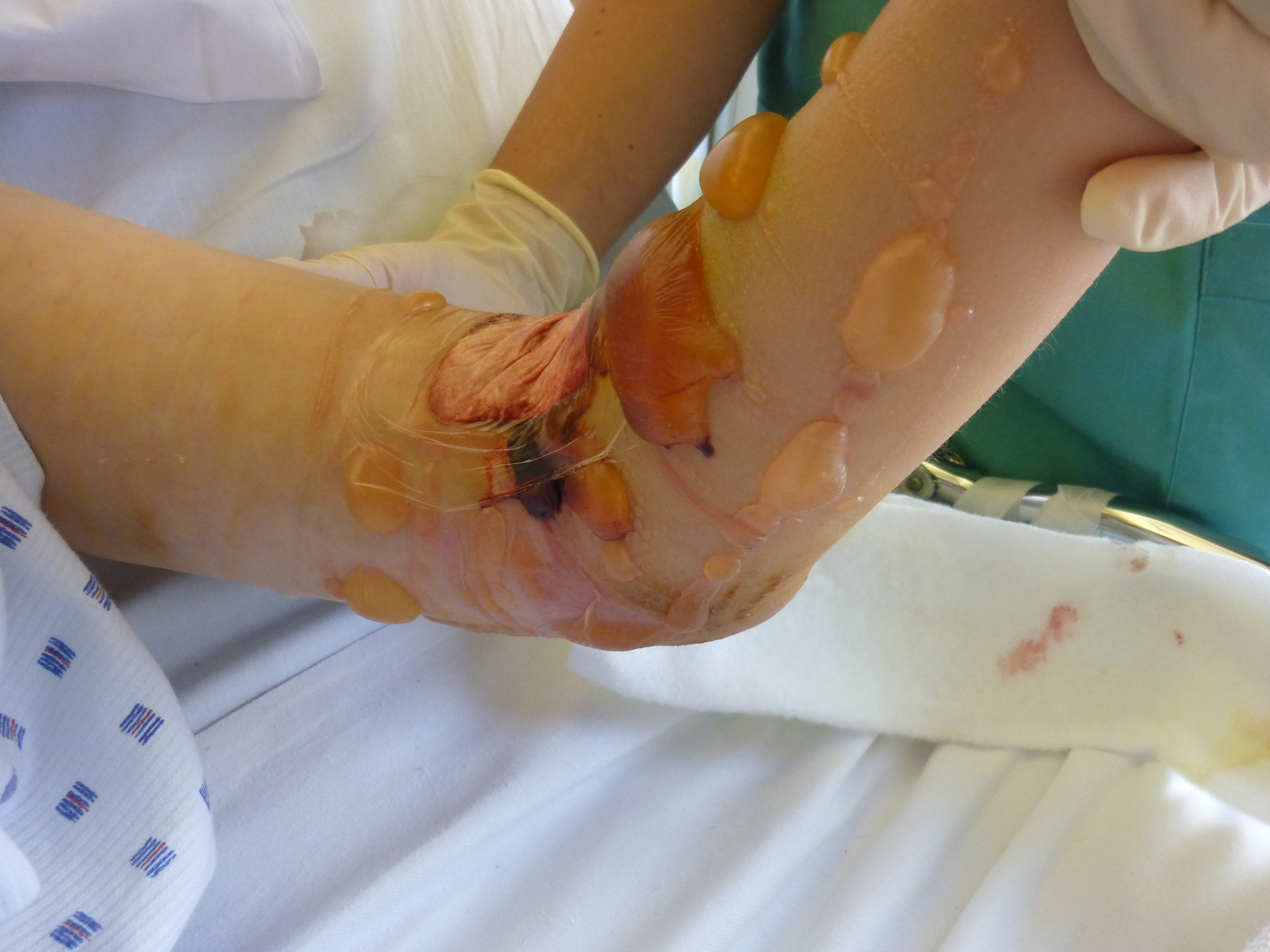
Acute compartment syndrome with blister formation in the arm of a child

There are five signs and symptoms of acute compartment syndrome. They are known as the "5 Ps": pain, pallor, decreased pulse, paresthesia, and paralysis. Pain and paresthesia are the early symptoms of compartment syndrome.

Common symptoms are:

- Pain: A person may feel pain greater than the exam findings. This pain may not be relieved by strong painkillers, including opioids such as morphine. It may be due to nerve damage from ischemia. A person may experience pain disproportionate to the findings of the physical examination. The pain is aggravated by passively stretching the muscle group within the compartment. However, such pain may disappear in the late stages of compartment syndrome.
- Paresthesia (altered sensation): A person may complain of "pins and needles," numbness, and a tingling sensation. This may progress to loss of sensation (anesthesia) if no intervention is made.

Uncommon symptoms are:

- Paralysis: Paralysis of the limb is a rare, late finding. It may indicate both a nerve or muscular lesion.
- Pallor: Pallor describes the loss of color to the affected limb. Other skin changes can include swelling, stiffness, or cold temperature.
- Pulselessness: A lack of pulse rarely occurs in patients, as pressures that cause compartment syndrome are often lower than arterial pressures. Absent pulses occur only with arterial injury or late-stage compartment syndrome, when pressures are very high.

=== Chronic ===
Chronic exertional compartment syndrome (CECS) may cause pain, tightness, cramps, weakness, and numbness. This pain can last for months or even years, but rest may relieve it. There may also be mild weakness in the affected area.

Exercise causes these symptoms. They start with muscle tightness, then a painful burning if exercise continues. A few minutes after exercise stops, the compartment pressure will drop, relieving the pain. Symptoms occur after a certain level of exercise. This threshold can range anywhere from 30 seconds of running to 2–3 miles of running. CECS most often occurs in the lower leg. The anterior compartment is most affected. Foot drop is a common symptom.

== Causes ==
=== Acute ===
Acute compartment syndrome (ACS) is a medical emergency. It can develop after traumatic injuries, such as car accidents, gunshot wounds, fractures, or intense sports. Examples include a severe crush injury or an open or closed fracture of an extremity. Rarely, ACS can develop after a minor injury or another medical issue. It can also affect the thigh, buttock, hand, abdomen, and foot. The most common cause of acute compartment syndrome is a fractured bone, usually the tibia. Leg compartment syndrome occurs in 1–10% of tibial fractures. It is strongly linked to tibial diaphysis fractures and other tibial injuries. Direct injury to blood vessels can reduce blood flow to soft tissues, causing compartment syndrome. Compartment syndrome can also be caused by:

- intravenous drug injection
- casts
- prolonged limb compression
- crush injuries
- anabolic steroid use
- vigorous exercise
- eschar from burns

Patients on anticoagulant therapy, or those with blood disorders such as hemophilia or leukemia are at higher risk of developing compartment syndrome.

Abdominal compartment syndrome occurs when the intra-abdominal pressure exceeds 20 mmHg and abdominal perfusion pressure is less than 60 mmHg. There are many causes, which can be broadly grouped into three mechanisms: primary (internal bleeding and swelling); secondary (vigorous fluid replacement as an unintended complication of resuscitative medical treatment, leading to the acute formation of ascites and a rise in intra-abdominal pressure); and recurrent (compartment syndrome that has returned after the initial treatment of secondary compartment syndrome).

Compartment syndrome after snake bite is rare. Its incidence varies from 0.2% to 1.36% as recorded in case reports. Compartment syndrome after a snake bite is more common in children. Increased white blood cell count of more than 1,650/μL and aspartate transaminase (AST) level of more than 33.5 U/L are associated with developing compartment syndrome. Otherwise, those bitten by venomous snakes should be observed for 48 hours to exclude the possibility of compartment syndrome.

Acute compartment syndrome due to severe/uncontrolled hypothyroidism is rare.

=== Chronic ===
Chronic compartment syndrome (CCS) is when repeated use of the muscles causes compartment syndrome. This is usually not an emergency, but loss of circulation can damage nearby nerves and muscles. The damage may be temporary or permanent.

A subset is chronic exertional compartment syndrome (CECS), often called exercise-induced compartment syndrome (EICS). CECS is often a diagnosis of exclusion. CECS of the leg is caused by exercise. This condition occurs commonly in the lower leg and various other locations within the body, such as the foot or forearm. CECS can be seen in athletes who train rigorously in activities that involve constant repetitive actions or motions.

== Pathophysiology ==
ACS is defined as a critical pressure increase within a confined compartmental space causing a decline in the perfusion pressure to the tissue within that compartment. A normal human body needs a pressure gradient for blood flow. It must go from the higher-pressure arterial system to the lower-pressure venous system. This causes blood to back up. Excess fluid leaks from the capillaries into the spaces between the soft tissue's cells. This swells the extracellular space and raises the pressure in the compartment. The swelling of the soft tissues around the blood vessels compresses the blood and lymphatic vessels. This causes more fluid to enter the extracellular spaces, leading to further compression. The pressure keeps rising due to the non-compliant fascia in the compartment. This cycle can cause tissue ischemia, a lack of oxygen, and necrosis, or tissue death. Paresthesia, or tingling, can start as early as 30 minutes after tissue ischemia begins. Permanent damage can occur 12 hours after the injury starts.

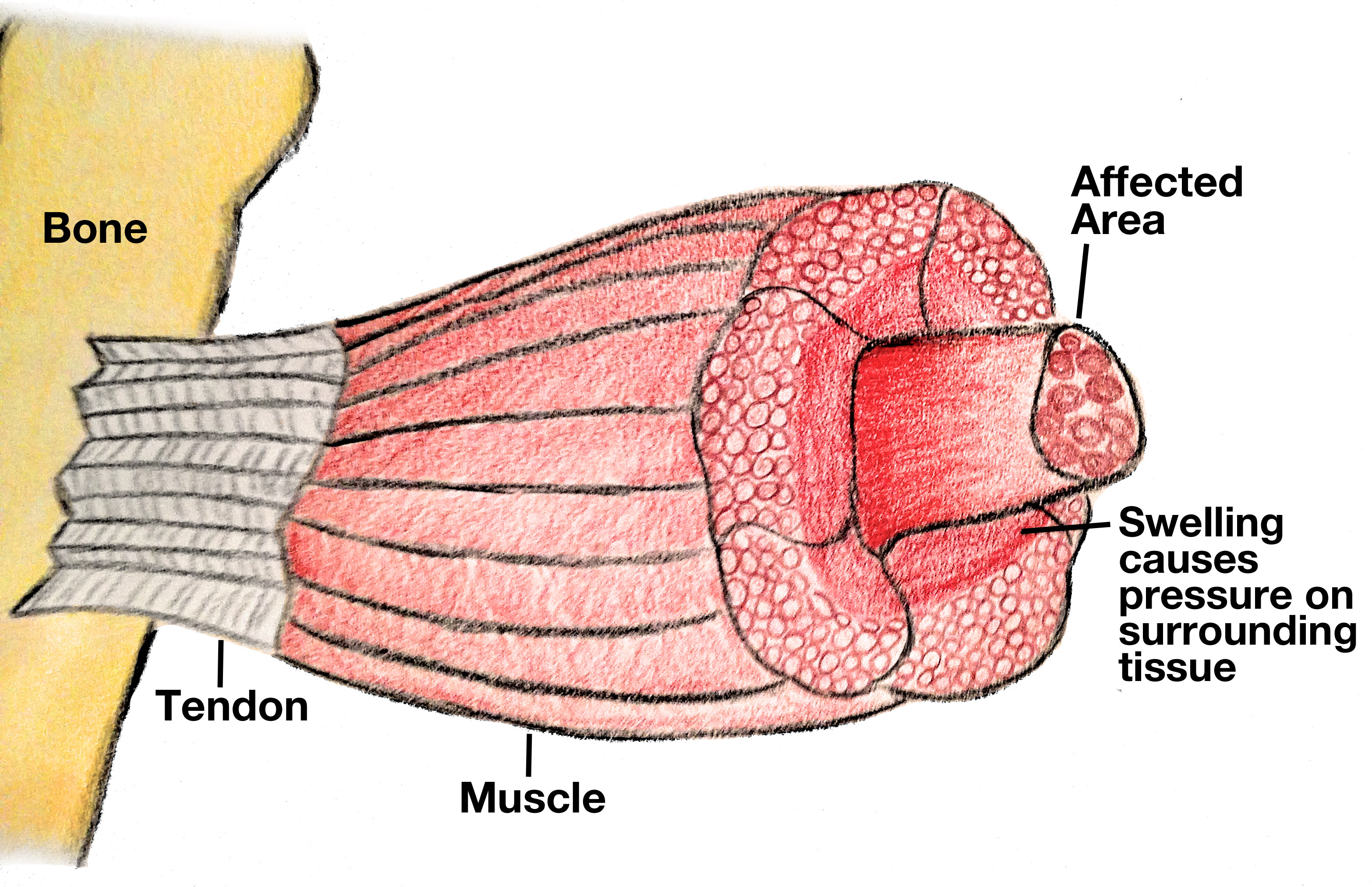
Pathophysiology of Compartment Syndrome

The reduced blood supply can trigger inflammation. This can cause the soft tissues to swell. Reperfusion therapy can worsen this inflammation. The fascia that defines the limbs' compartments does not stretch. Even a small bleed or muscle swelling can greatly raise the pressure.

The pathophysiology of CECS is not entirely understood. In CECS, pressure in an anatomical compartment increases due to a 20% increase in muscle volume. This builds pressure in the tissues and muscles, causing ischemia. Increased muscle weight reduces the compartment volume of the surrounding fascial borders, raising compartment pressure. An increase in the pressure of the tissue can force fluid to leak into the interstitial space (extracellular fluid), leading to a disruption of the micro-circulation of the leg.

== Diagnosis ==
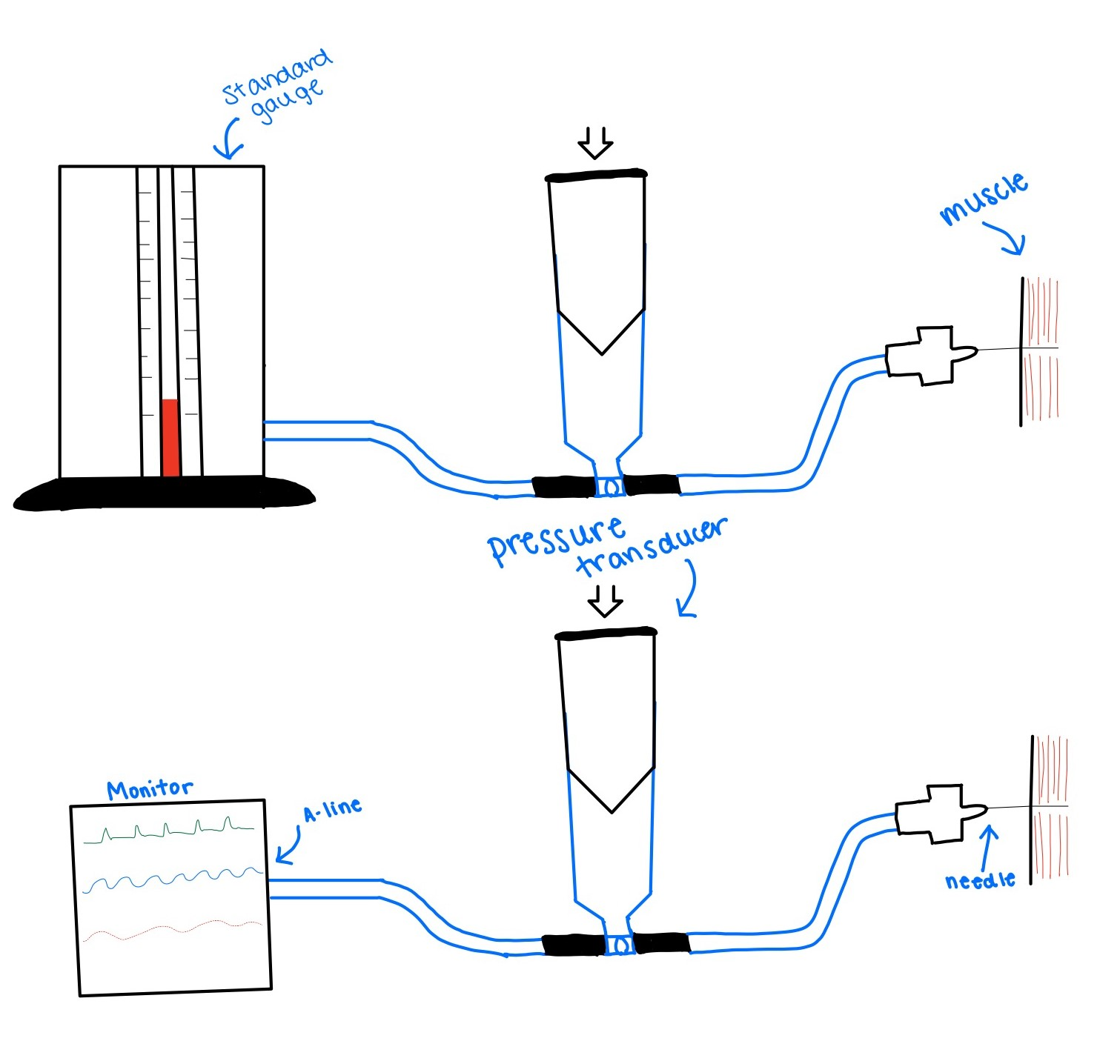
Pressure gauge used to measure intracompartmental pressure in suspected compartment syndrome. The device consists of a needle catheter that is inserted directly into the affected limb and then connected to a pressure transducer. The transducer can relay the measurement to an A-line monitor or a standard pressure gauge.

Compartment syndrome is a clinical diagnosis. It comes from a provider's exam and the patient's history. Diagnosis may also require measuring intracompartmental pressure. Using both methods increases the accuracy of diagnosing compartment syndrome. A transducer connected to a catheter is inserted 5 cm into the zone of injury to measure the intracompartmental pressure. Normal pressure is 10 mmHg. Anything greater can compromise circulation, and 30 mmHg has been commonly cited as the upper threshold before circulation is lost.

Noninvasive methods, such as near-infrared spectroscopy (NIRS), show promise in controlled settings. NIRS uses sensors on the skin. However, with limited data, the gold standard for diagnosis is the clinical presentation and intracompartmental pressure.

Chronic exertional compartment syndrome is often diagnosed by ruling out other conditions. The key sign is that there are no symptoms when at rest. The best test is to measure intracompartmental pressures after running, when symptoms return. Tests such as X-rays, CT scans, and MRIs help rule out other problems. But they don't confirm compartment syndrome. However, MRI is effective for diagnosing chronic exertional compartment syndrome.

== Treatment ==
=== Acute ===
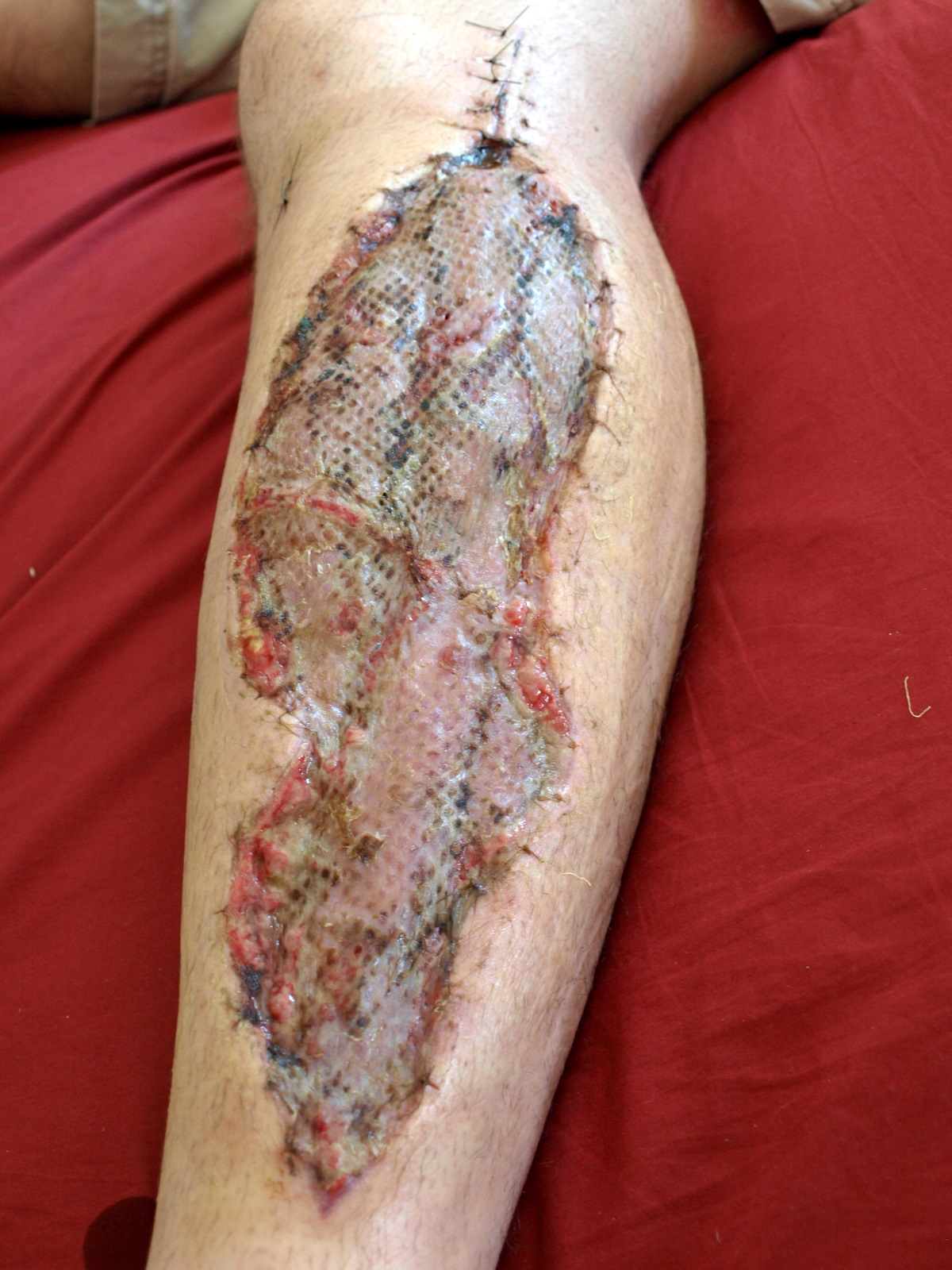
A skin graft is used to close a fasciotomy wound.

If external compression, such as a cast or tourniquet, has caused increased pressure, it is removed and the limb placed at heart level. Otherwise, fasciotomy, a cut into the fascia beneath the skin, immediately decreases pressure and is generally the only effective treatment. Although closing a fasciotomy wound quickly reduces complications, this is not typically achievable as compartment syndrome may recur. Before the wound is closed, it may be covered with moist dressings or, in some cases, treated with negative-pressure wound therapy, which can additionally be used for closure. Closure is often achieved using the so-called shoelace technique, where staples are inserted into the skin which are used to pull the sides of the wound together with a thread. A skin graft may be needed to close the wound. Fasciotomy is often not necessary when compartment syndrome is caused by snake bites, where pressure may instead be relieved with antivenom.

=== Chronic ===
Chronic exertional compartment syndrome can be treated by reducing or stopping exercise-related activities, massage, non-steroidal anti-inflammatory medication, and physiotherapy. If symptoms persist after basic treatment, compartment syndrome may be treated with a fasciotomy.

== Prognosis ==
Researchers have reported a mortality rate of 47% for acute compartment syndrome of the thigh. A study showed the fasciotomy rate for acute compartment syndrome ranges from 2% to 24%. The key factor in acute compartment syndrome is the time to diagnosis and fasciotomy. A missed or late diagnosis may require limb amputation to survive. After a fasciotomy, some symptoms may be permanent. It depends on which compartment was affected, the time until surgery, and muscle necrosis. Muscle necrosis can happen fast, sometimes within just 3 hours after an injury. A fasciotomy in the leg's lateral compartment might cause symptoms affecting nearby nerves and muscles. These may include foot drop, numbness along leg, numbness of big toe, pain, and loss of foot eversion.

=== Complications ===
If pressure is not relieved, tissues may die (necrosis) in the affected compartment. Blood will be unable to enter the smallest vessels. Capillary perfusion pressure will fall. This, in turn, leads to a gradual lack of oxygen in the tissues that depend on this blood supply. Without enough oxygen, the tissue will die. On a large scale, this can cause Volkmann's contracture in the affected limbs. It is permanent and irreversible. Other complications include neurological deficits, gangrene, and chronic regional pain syndrome. Rhabdomyolysis and kidney failure are also possible. Some case series report rhabdomyolysis in 23% of patients with ACS.

== Epidemiology ==
In a case series of 164 people with acute compartment syndrome, 69% had an associated fracture. The article's authors found that the yearly rate of acute compartment syndrome is 1 to 7.3 cases per 100,000 people. It varies greatly by age and gender in trauma. Men are ten times more likely than women to get ACS. The mean age for ACS is 30 in men and 44 in women. People under 35 may get ACS more often. This is likely because they have more muscle mass. The anterior compartment of the leg is where ACS usually happens.

== In children ==
The pathophysiology of acute compartment syndrome in children is the same as adults. However, cases are complicated by challenges in examination and communication with pediatric patients. Children may not be able to effectively report their pain symptoms. In addition, it can take longer to develop high pressures in pediatric compartments. Besides the "5 Ps," the "3 As" can diagnose compartment syndrome in children: increasing anxiety, agitation, and analgesic needs. Normal compartment pressures in children are typically higher than adults. The most common cause of compartment syndrome in children is traumatic injury. In children <10 years of age, the cause is usually vascular injury or infection. In children >14 years of age, the cause is usually due to trauma or surgical positioning. Treatment for compartment syndrome in children is the same as adults.

== See also ==
- Abdominal compartment syndrome
- Escharotomy
- Ischemia-reperfusion injury of the appendicular musculoskeletal system
