= Turnbuckle =

Device for adjusting the tension or length of ropes or cables

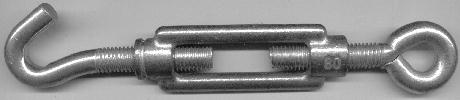
Small turnbuckle, 80 mm (3 5/32 in)

A turnbuckle, stretching screw or bottlescrew is a device for adjusting the tension or length of ropes, cables, tie rods, and other tensioning systems. It normally consists of two threaded eye bolts, one screwed into each end of a small metal frame, one with a conventional right-hand thread and the other with a left-hand thread. The tension can be adjusted by rotating the frame, which causes both eye bolts to be screwed in or out simultaneously, without twisting the eye bolts or attached cables.

== Uses ==
Turnbuckles are most commonly used in applications which require a great deal of tension; they can range in mass from about 10 grams (3/8 oz) for thin cable used in a garden fence, to tonnes for structural elements in buildings and suspension bridges.

=== Aircraft ===
Turnbuckles have been used in aircraft construction, especially during the early years of aviation. Historically, biplanes might use turnbuckles to adjust the tension on structural wires bracing their wings. Turnbuckles are also widely used on flexible cables in flight control systems. In both cases they are secured with lockwire or specifically designed wire clips to prevent them from turning and losing tension due to vibration.

=== Shipping ===
Turnbuckles are used for tensioning a ship's rigging and lashings. A variant of the turnbuckle called a bottle screw features an enclosed tubular body.

=== Entertainment industry ===
Turnbuckles are used in nearly all rigging performed in the entertainment industry, including theatre, film, and live concert performances. In entertainment rigging, turnbuckles are more commonly used to make small adjustments in line lengths. This is generally to make a flown (hoisted) unit sit parallel to the stage. Another way a turnbuckle could prove helpful is with making very minor height or angle adjustments.

=== Pipe systems ===
Turnbuckles are used in piping systems as a way to provide minor adjustments for field inconsistencies. This also allows for a minimum amount of resistance when transferring the load to the support components.

=== Orthopaedics ===
A type of splint is used for upper limb to produce gradual stretching over contracted joint by its turn buckle mechanism. Used to treat stiff elbow and Volkmann Ischemic Contracture.

=== Professional wrestling ===
In professional wrestling, turnbuckles are used to attach the ring ropes to the ring posts. Turnbuckles used for this purpose are usually covered with a protective pad to prevent injury, but wrestlers (especially "heel" wrestlers) sometimes remove the pad in order to increase the damage caused by Irish whips and similar moves.

== Gallery ==
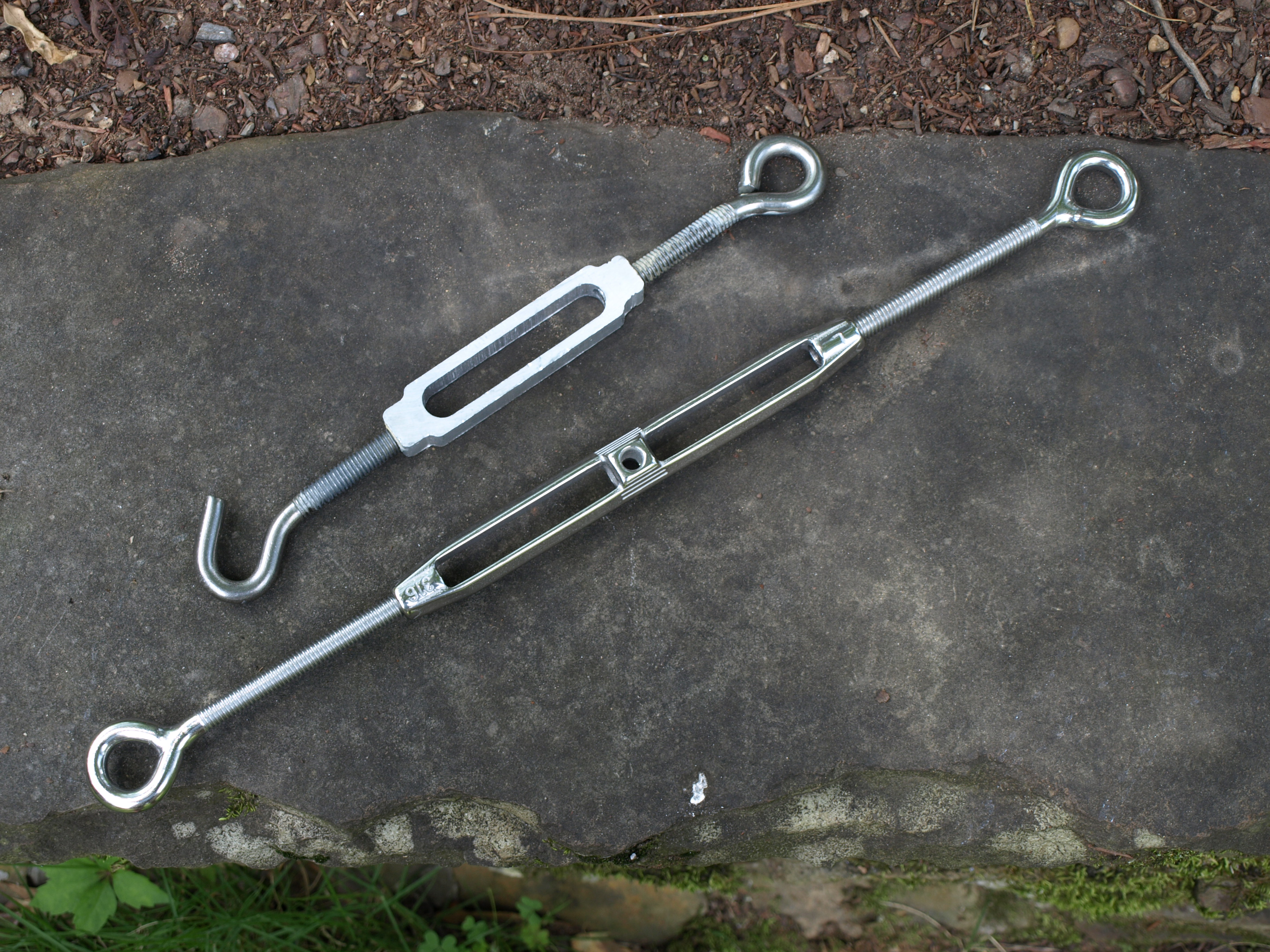
Top: lower quality aluminum bolt and hook turnbuckle; bottom: higher quality cast stainless steel turnbuckle

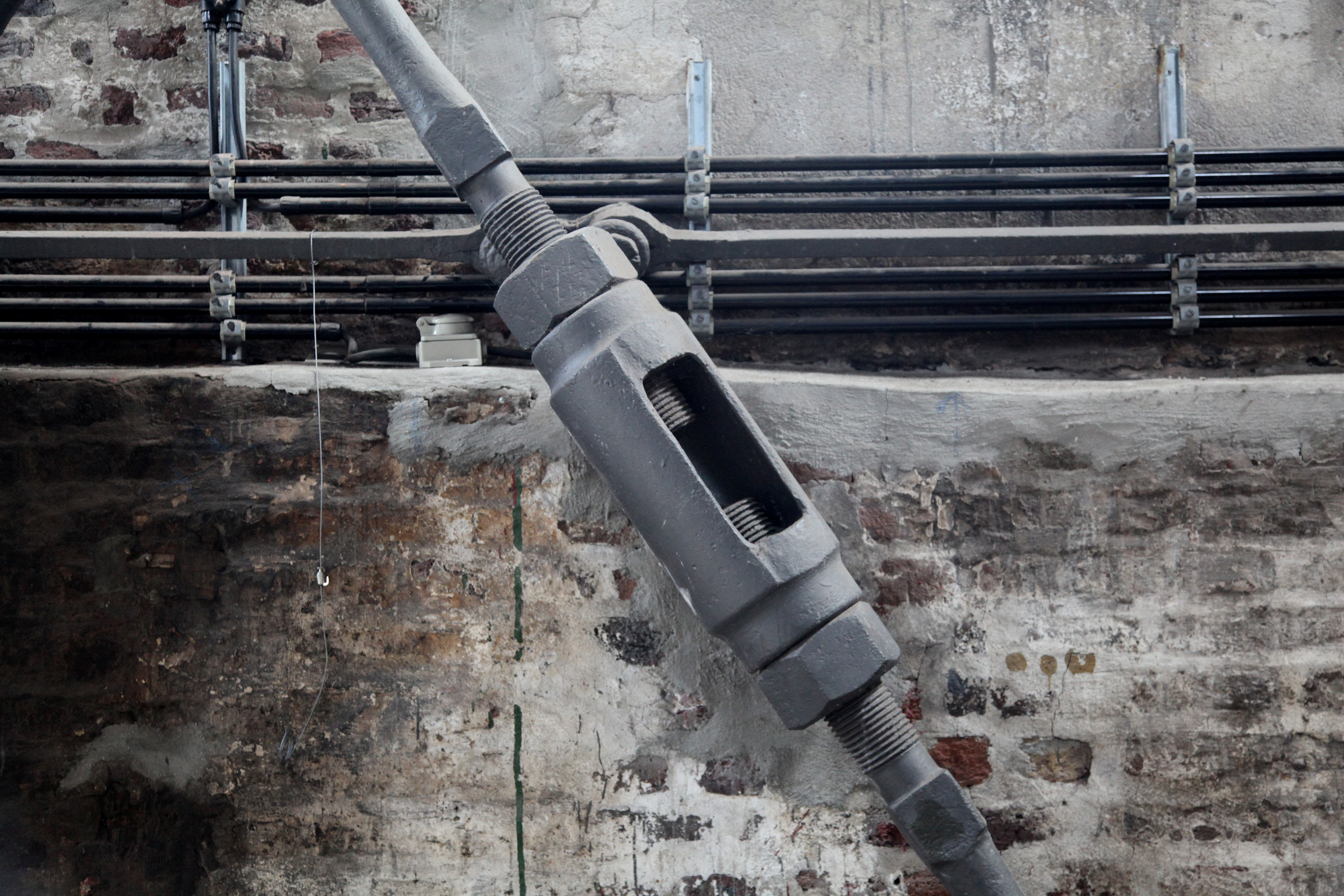
Turnbuckle used in building support

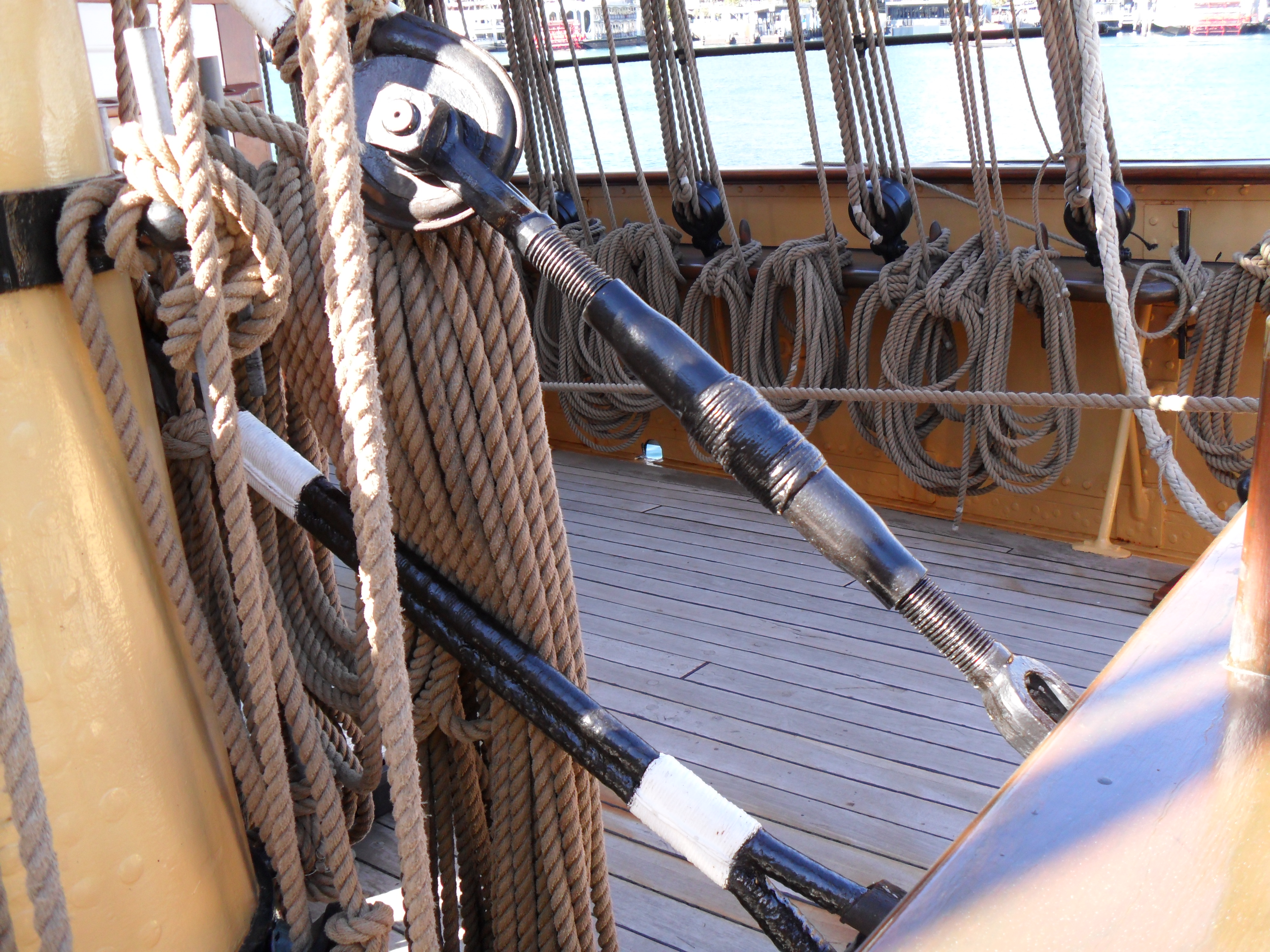
Bottle screw support for the main topmast fore stay of a sailing ship

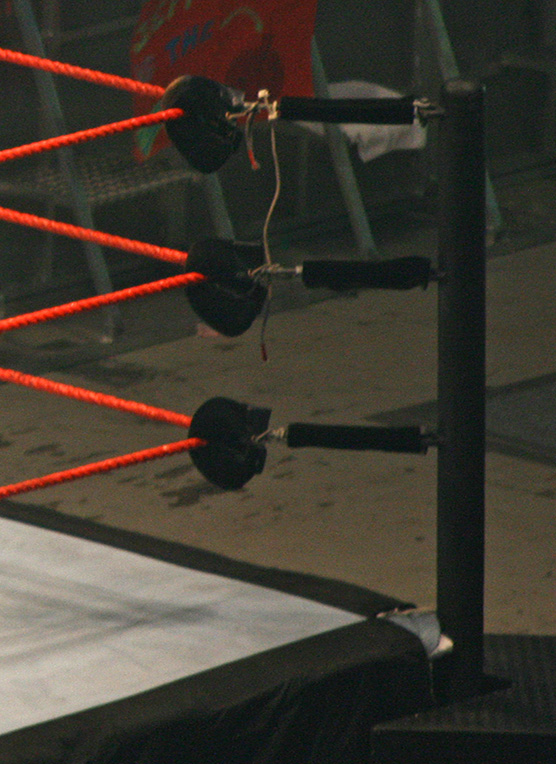
Padded turnbuckles in a wrestling ring connecting ring ropes to post

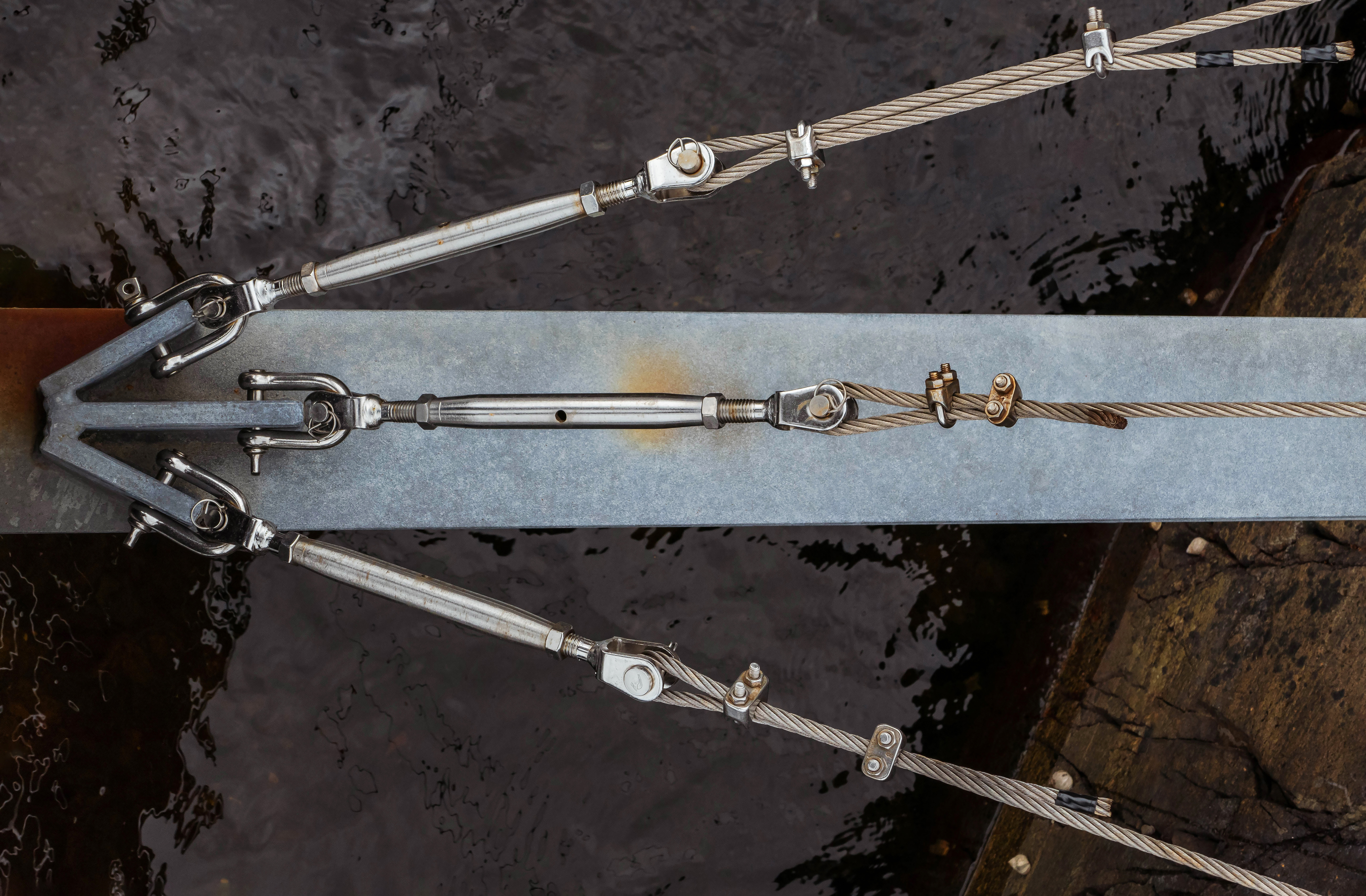
Turnbuckles on a support for a boat jetty

== See also ==
- Buffers and chain coupler
- Guy-wire
- Mechanical joint
