= CA3 =

CA3, CA-3, or Ca.3 may refer to:

- Carbonic anhydrase III, muscle specific, a human gene
- Cornu Ammonis region 3, one of the hippocampal subfields
- United States Court of Appeals for the Third Circuit
- Buhl-Verville CA-3 Airster
- Buhl CA-3 Airsedan
- CAC CA-3 Wirraway
- California's 3rd congressional district
- California State Route 3
- Caproni Ca.3, an Italian heavy bomber of World War I and the post-war era
