= Exertional rhabdomyolysis =

- Other names: exercise-induced rhabdomyolysis

Exertional rhabdomyolysis (ER) is the breakdown of muscle from extreme physical exertion. It is one of many types of rhabdomyolysis that can occur, and because of this, the exact prevalence and incidence are unclear.

== Cause ==
Exertional rhabdomyolysis is more likely to occur when strenuous exercise is performed under high temperatures and humidity. Poor hydration levels before, during, and after strenuous bouts of exercise have also been reported to lead to exertional rhabdomyolysis. This condition and its signs and symptoms are not well known amongst the sport and fitness community. Because of this, it is believed that the incidence is greater, but highly underreported.

Risks that lead to ER include exercise in hot and humid conditions, improper hydration, inadequate recovery between bouts of exercise, intense physical training, and inadequate fitness levels for beginning high-intensity workouts. Eccentric contraction of muscles can result in ER more often than concentric contraction. Dehydration is one of the biggest factors that can give almost immediate feedback from the body by producing very dark-colored urine.

== Mechanism ==
=== Anatomy ===
Exertional rhabdomyolysis results from damage to the intracellular proteins inside the sarcolemma. Myosin and actin break down in the sarcomeres when ATP is no longer available due to injury to the sarcoplasmic reticulum. Damage to the sarcolemma and sarcoplasmic reticulum from direct trauma or high force production causes a high influx of calcium ions into the muscle fibers increasing calcium permeability. Calcium ions build up in the mitochondria, impairing cellular respiration. The mitochondria are unable to produce enough ATP to power the cell properly. Reduction in ATP production impairs the cells' ability to extract calcium from the muscle cell.

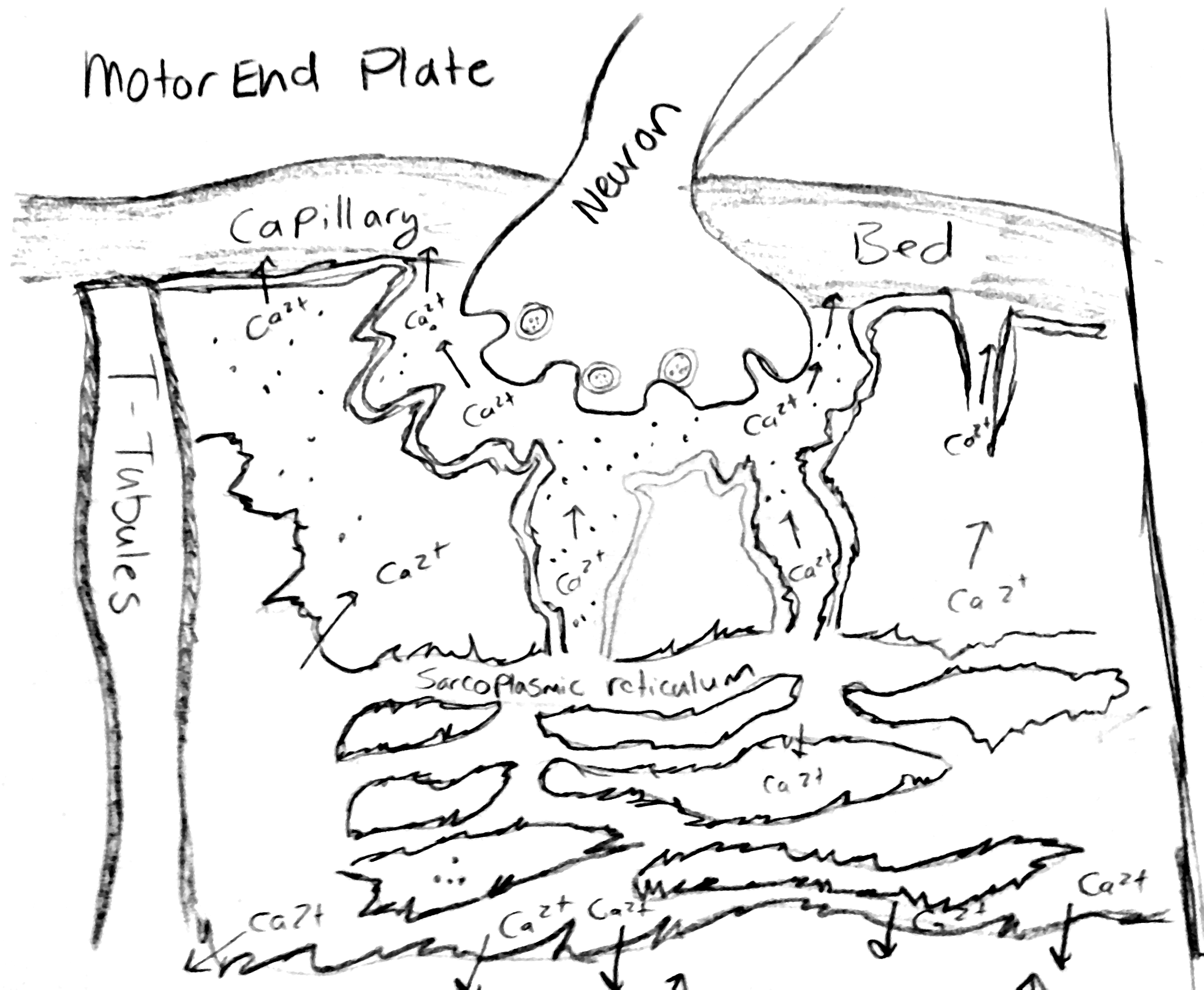
Motor endplate of a person with rhabdomyolysis

The ion imbalance causes calcium-dependent enzymes to activate which break down muscle proteins even further. A high concentration of calcium activates muscle cells, causing the muscle to contract while inhibiting its ability to relax.

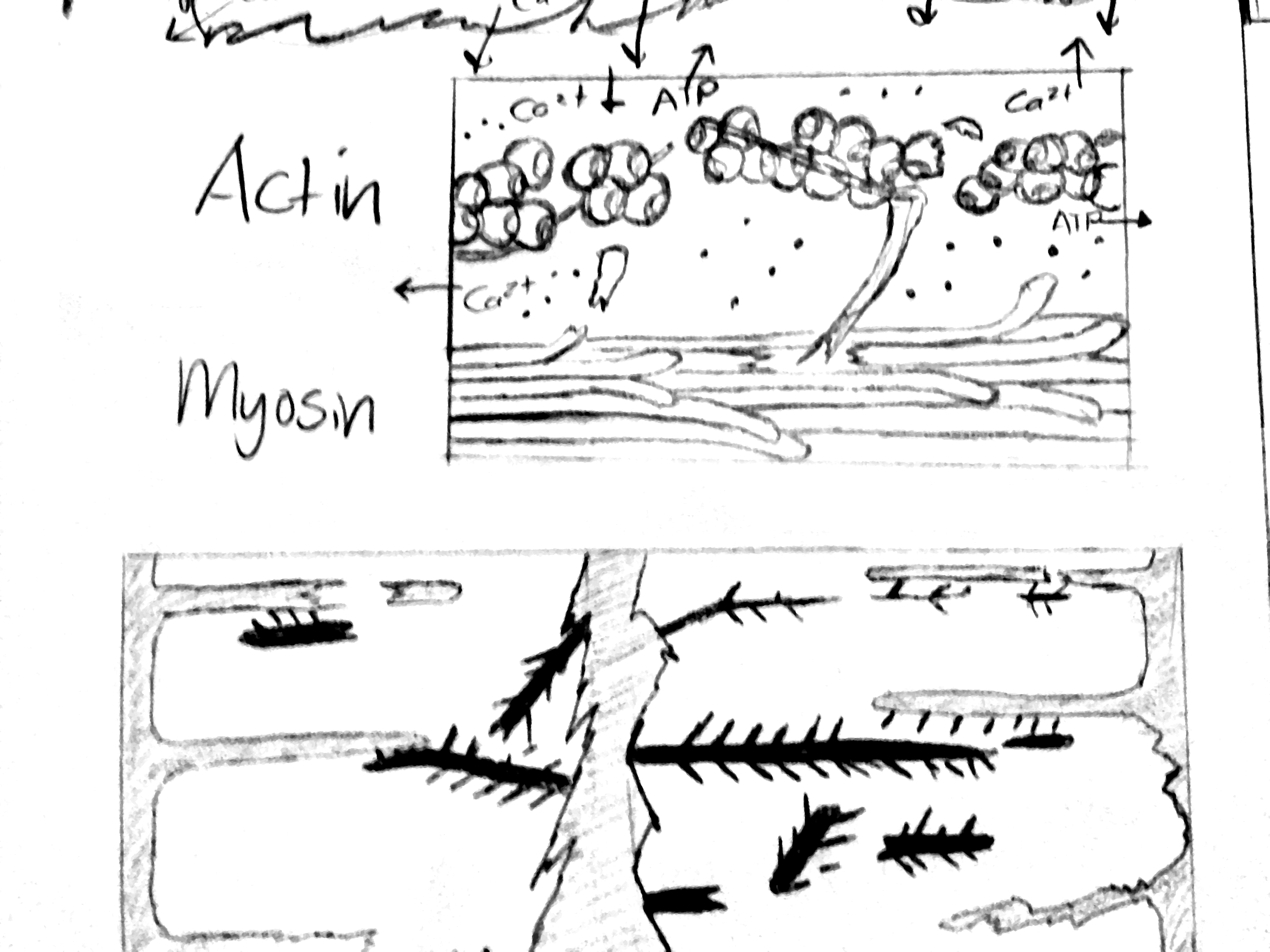
Actin, and myosin

The increase of sustained muscle contraction leads to oxygen and ATP depletion with prolonged exposure to calcium. The muscle cell membrane pump may become damaged allowing free form myoglobin to leak into the bloodstream.

=== Physiology ===
Rhabdomyolysis causes the myosin and actin to degenerate into smaller proteins that travel into the circulatory system. The body reacts by increasing intracellular swelling to the injured tissue to send repair cells to the area. This allows creatine kinase and myoglobin to be flushed from the tissue where it travels in the blood until reaching the kidneys. In addition to the proteins released, large quantities of ions such as intracellular potassium, sodium, and chloride find their way into the circulatory system. Intracellular potassium ion has deleterious effects on the heart's ability to generate action potentials leading to cardiac arrhythmias. Consequently, this can affect peripheral and central perfusion which in turn can affect all major organ systems in the body.

When the protein reaches the kidneys it causes a strain on the anatomical structures reducing its effectiveness as a filter for the body. The protein acts as a dam as it forms into tight aggregates when it enters the renal tubules. In addition, the increased intracellular calcium has greater time to bind due to the blockage allowing for renal calculi to form. As a result this causes urine output to decrease allowing for the uric acid to build up inside the organ. The increased acid concentration allows the iron from the aggregate protein to be released into the surrounding renal tissue. Iron then strips away molecular bonds of the surrounding tissue which eventually will lead to kidney failure if the tissue damage is too great.

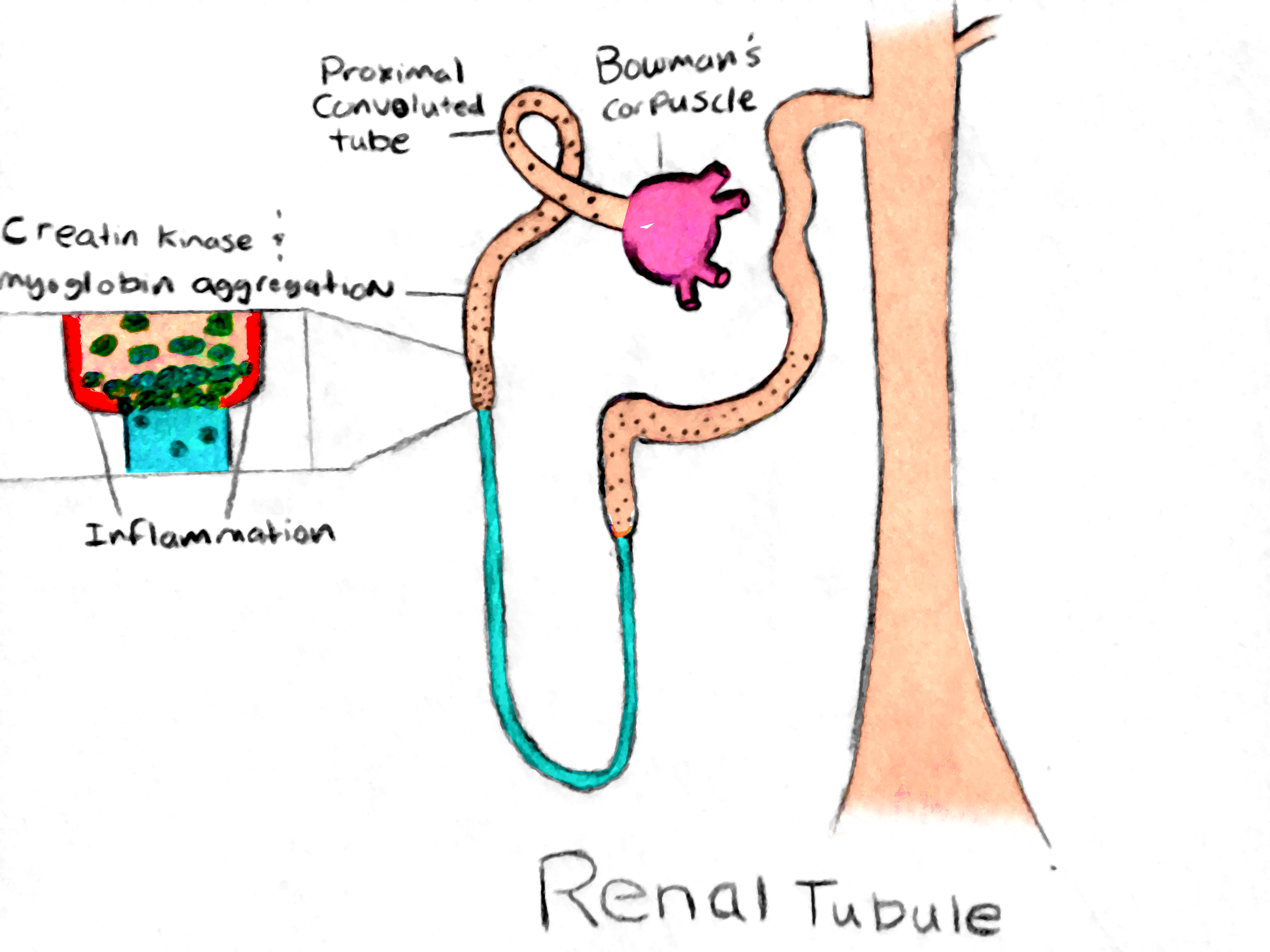
Renal tubules of exertional rhabdomyolysis

=== Mechanical consideration ===
Muscle degeneration from rhabdomyolysis destroys the myosin and actin filaments in the affected tissue. This initiates the body's natural reaction to increasing perfusion to the area allowing for an influx of specialized cells to repair the injury. However, the swelling increases the intracellular pressure beyond normal limits. As the pressure builds in the muscle tissue, the surrounding tissue is crushed against the underlying tissue and bone. This is known as compartment syndrome which leads to greater death of the surrounding muscle tissue around the injury. As the muscle dies this will cause pain to radiate from the affected area into the compartmentalized tissue. A loss of range of motion from swelling will also be seen in the affected limb. Along with muscle strength weakness associated with the muscles involved from loss of filament interaction.

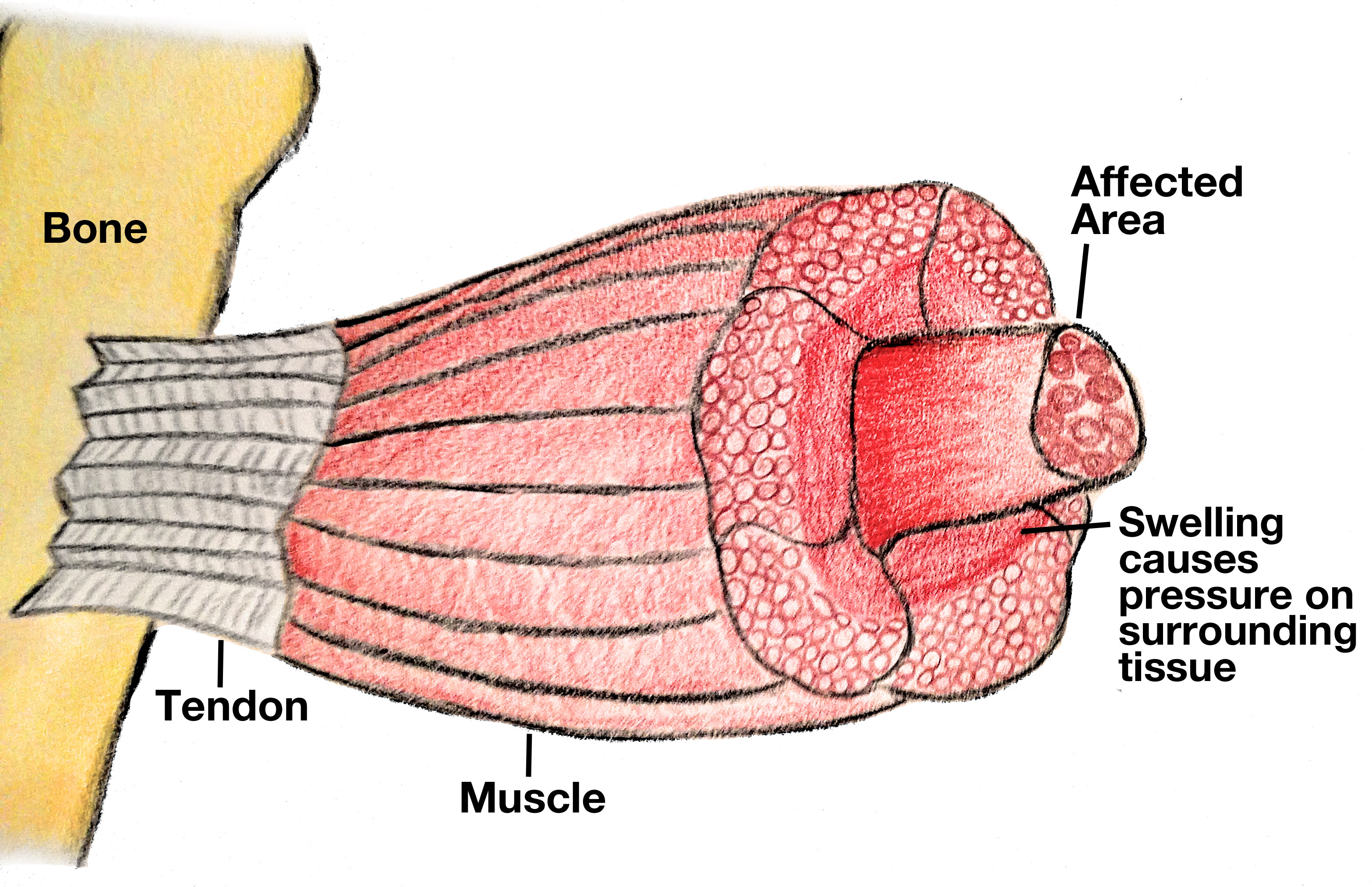
Compartment syndrome in muscle

Dehydration is a common risk factor for exertional rhabdomyolysis because it causes a reduction of plasma volume during exertion. This leads to a reduction of blood flow through the vascular system which inhibits blood vessel constriction.

== Diagnosis ==
Exertional rhabdomyolysis, the exercise-induced muscle breakdown that results in muscle pain/soreness, is commonly diagnosed using the urine myoglobin test accompanied by high levels of creatine kinase (CK). Myoglobin is the protein released into the bloodstream when skeletal muscle is broken down. The urine test simply examines whether myoglobin is present or absent. When results are positive the urine normally obtains a dark, brown color followed by serum CK level evaluation to determine the severity of muscle damage. Elevated levels of serum CK greater than 5,000 U/L that are not caused by myocardial infarction, brain injury or disease, generally indicate serious muscle damage confirming the diagnosis of ER. Urine is often a dark "cola" color as a result of the excretion of muscle cell components.

== Prevention ==
Military data suggest that the risk of exertional rhabdomyolysis can be lowered by engaging in prolonged lower-intensity exercise, as opposed to high-intensity exercise over a shorter time period. In all athletic programs, three features should be present: (1) emphasizing prolonged lower-intensity exercise, as opposed to repetitive max intensity exercises; (2) adequate rest periods and a high-carbohydrate diet, to replenish glycogen stores; and (3) proper hydration, to enhance renal clearance of myoglobin. Also, exercise in above-average temperature and humidity can increase risk for ER. ER can be avoided by gradually increasing intensity during new exercise regimens, properly hydrating, acclimatization, and avoidance of diuretics during times of strenuous activity.

== Treatment ==
After ER is diagnosed, treatment is applied to 1) avoid renal dysfunction and 2) alleviate symptoms. This should be followed by recommended rehabilitation program, exercise prescription (ExRx). Treatment involves extensive hydration normally done through IV fluid replacement with administration of normal saline until CK levels reduce to a maximum of 1,000 U/L. Proper treatment will ensure hydration and normalize muscle discomfort (pain), flu-like symptoms, CK levels, and myoglobin levels for patient to begin ExRx.

Although sufficient evidence is currently lacking, supplementation with a combination of sodium bicarbonate and mannitol is commonly utilized to prevent kidney failure in rhabdomyolysis patients. Sodium bicarbonate alkalizes urine to stop myoglobin from precipitating in renal tubules. Mannitol has several effects, including vasodilatation of the renal vasculature, osmotic diuresis, and free-radical scavenging.

=== Recovery ===
Before initiating any form of physical activity, the individual must demonstrate a normal level of functioning with all previous symptoms absent. Physical activity should be supervised by a health care professional in case of a recurrence. However, in some low-risk individuals, supervision by a medical professional is not required as long as the individual follows up with weekly checkups. Proper hydration prior to performing physical activity and performing exercise in cool, dry environments may reduce the chances of developing a reoccurring episode of ER. Lastly, it is imperative for urine and blood values to be monitored along with careful observation for the redevelopment of any signs or symptoms.

The recovery program focuses on progressive conditioning/reconditioning the individual and improving functional mobility. However, special considerations prior to participating in the rehabilitation program include the individual's 1) extent of muscle injury, if any 2) level of fitness before the incident and 3) weight training experience. These special considerations collectively are a form of assessing the individual's capacity to perform physical activity, which is ultimately used to specify the ExRx design.
