= Volkmann's contracture =

- Other names: Volkmann's ischaemic contracture
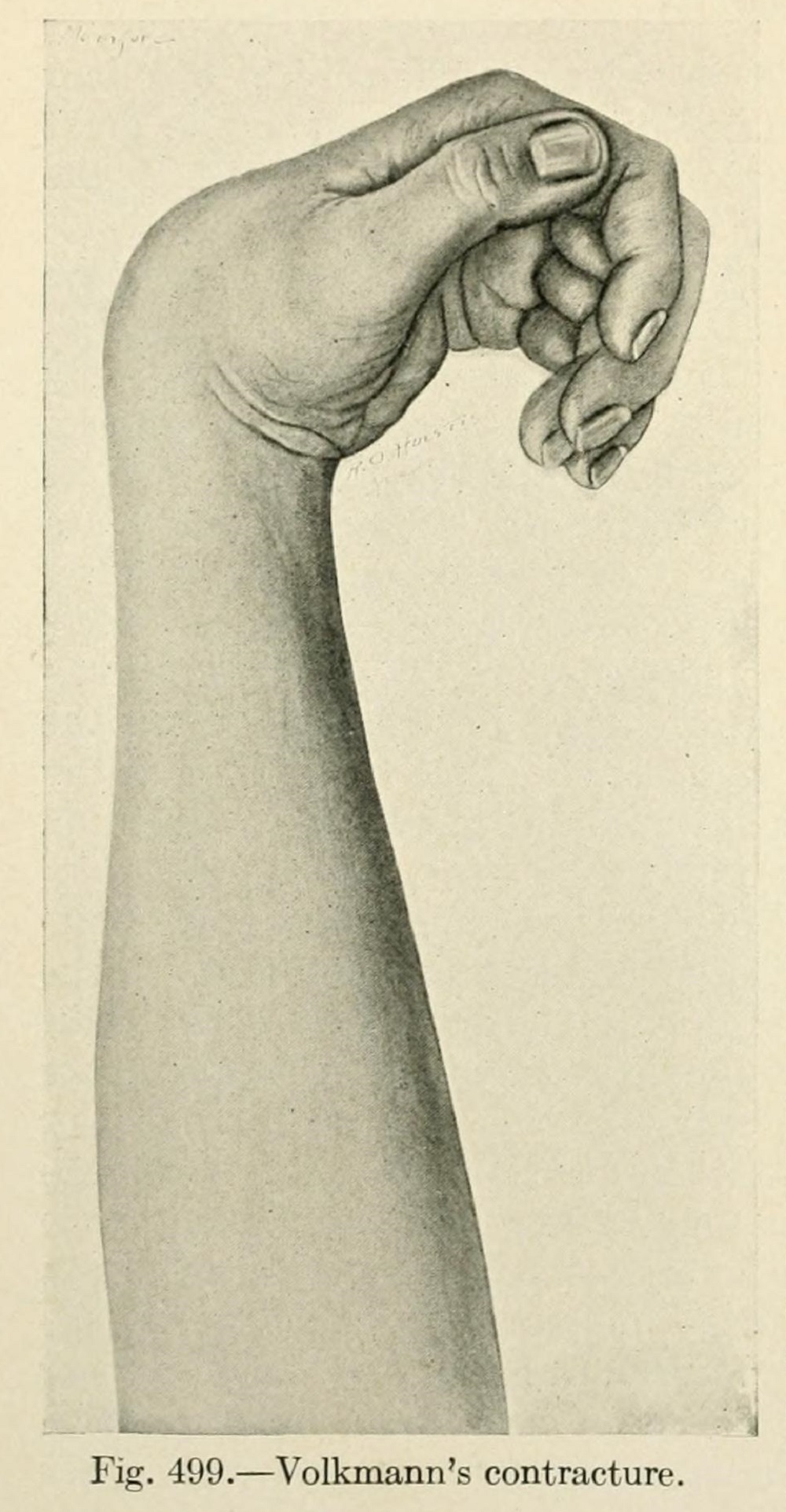
- Specialty: Orthopaedics

Volkmann's contracture is a permanent flexion contracture of the hand at the wrist, resulting in a claw-like deformity of the hand and fingers. Passive extension of fingers is restricted and painful.

== Signs and symptoms ==
The most important signs and symptoms of compartment syndrome are observable before actual contracture. What is known as the five Ps of compartment syndrome include: pain, generally the initial symptom, accompanied by pulselessness, pallor, paralysis, and paraesthesias. Pain will likely also increase upon extension of the affected limbs hands and fingers, which is one of the earliest signs of compartment syndrome and should urgently be followed up by an exam to look for potential development of Volkmann contracture itself. Palpating for tissue firmness in the forearm, and the pulse volume and character of the radial artery, also reflects the degree of compartment syndrome.

== Causes ==
Any fracture in the elbow region or upper arm may lead to Volkmann's ischemic contracture, but it is especially associated with supracondylar fracture of the humerus. It is also caused by fractures of the forearm bones if they cause bleeding from the major blood vessels of the forearm.

The condition may be caused by obstruction on the brachial artery near the elbow, possibly from improper use of a tourniquet, improper use of a plaster cast, or compartment syndrome.

== Pathophysiology ==
Volkmann's contracture results from acute ischaemia and necrosis of the muscle fibres of the flexor group of muscles of the forearm, especially the flexor digitorum profundus and flexor pollicis longus. The muscles become fibrotic and shortened.

== Prevention ==
Prevention of the condition requires restoration of blood flow after injury and reduction of compartmental pressure on the muscles. Any splints, bandages, or other devices that might be obstructing circulation must be removed.

A fasciotomy may be required to reduce pressure in the muscle compartment.

== Treatment ==
If contracture occurs, surgery to release the fixed tissues may help with the deformity and function of the hand. In established stage reconstructive surgery may be needed.

== History ==
It is named after Richard von Volkmann (1830–1889), the 19th century German doctor who first described it, in a paper on "non-Infective Ischemic conditions of various fascial compartments in the extremities". Because the contracture occurred at the same time as the paralysis, he considered a nerve cause to be unlikely.
