= Fasciotomy =

Surgical cutting of connective tissue (fascia) to restore blood circulation in an area

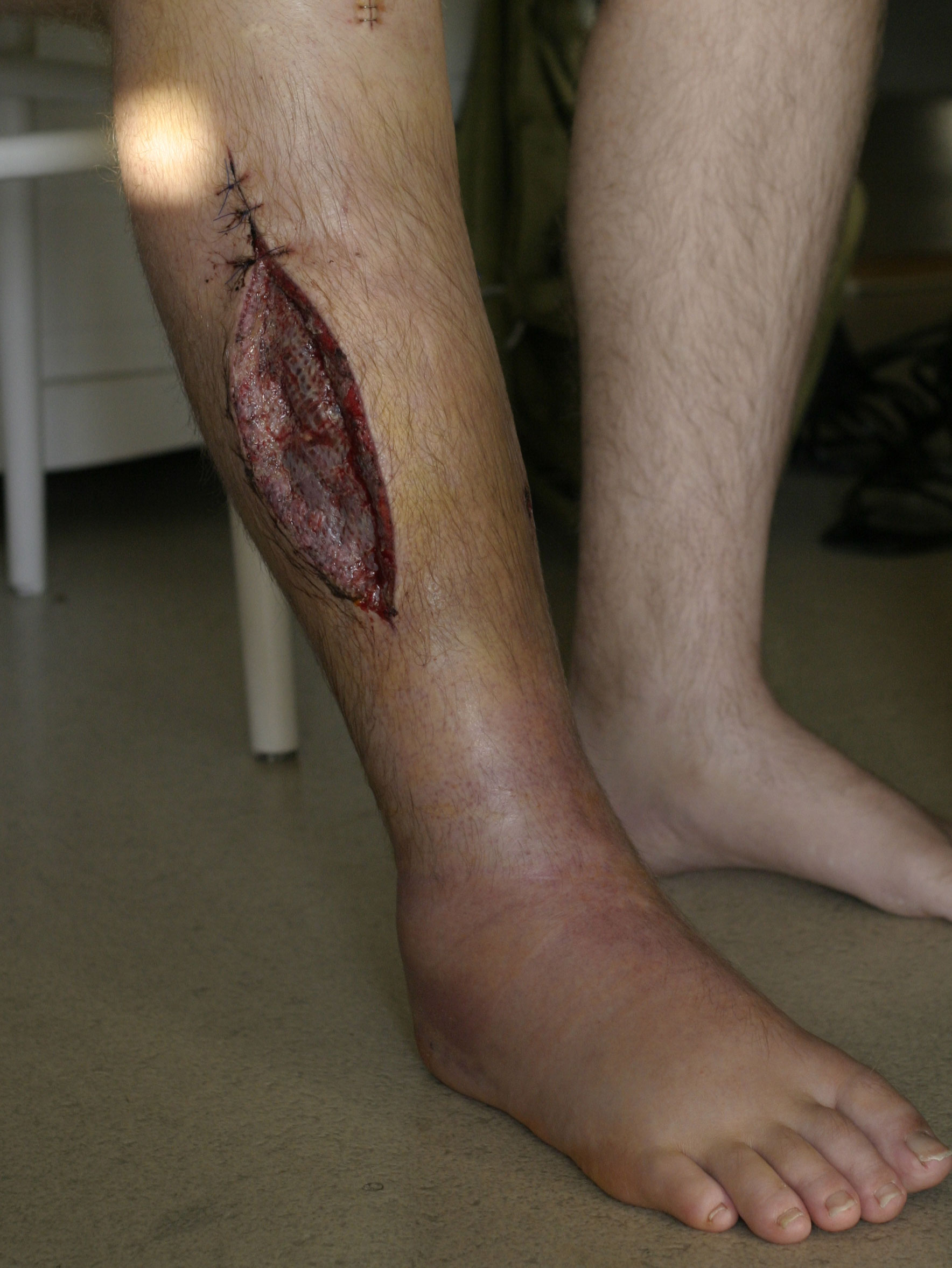
- Once the pressure is reduced, the fasciotomy is covered with a skin graft.
- ICD-9: 82.12 83.14

Fasciotomy or fasciectomy is a surgical procedure where a fascia is cut to relieve tension or pressure in order to treat the resulting loss of circulation to an area of tissue or muscle. Fasciotomy is a limb-saving procedure when used to treat acute compartment syndrome. It is also sometimes used to treat chronic compartment stress syndrome. The procedure has a very high rate of success, with the most common problem being accidental damage to a nearby nerve.

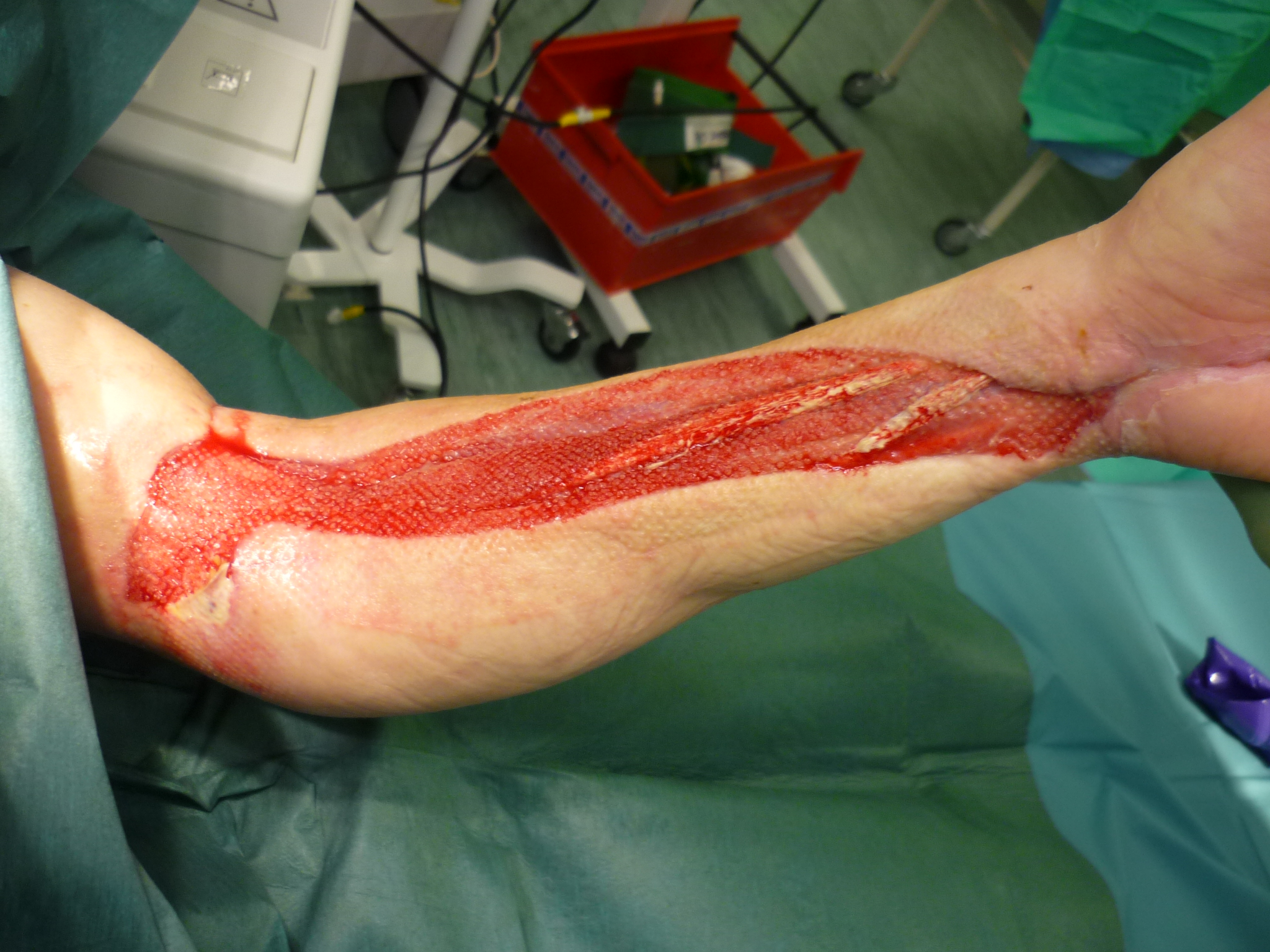
A forearm fasciotomy prior to skin grafting.

== Indications ==
Compartment syndrome is one of the conditions where a fasciotomy may be indicated. People who are likely to have injuries needing a fasciotomy include the following:

- Crush injuries
- Athletes who have sustained one or more serious impact injuries
- People with severe burns
- People who are severely overweight
- Snakebite victims, but very rarely

== Complications ==
A delay in performing the procedure can lead to neurovascular complications or lead to the need for amputation of a limb. Complications can also involve the formation of scar tissue after the operation. A thickening of the surgical scars can result in the loss of mobility of the joint involved. This can be addressed through occupational or physical therapy.

== Process ==
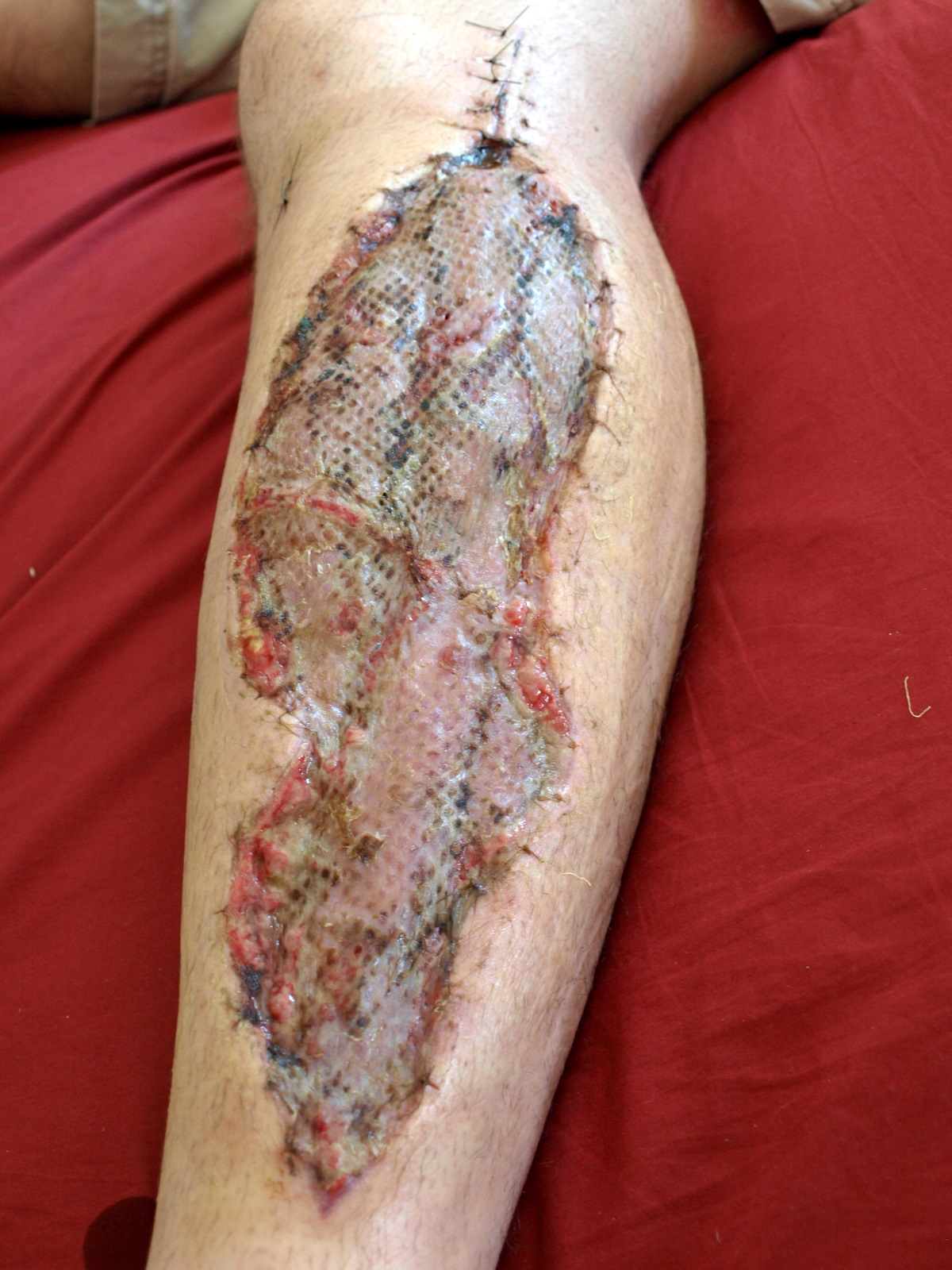
Wound covered with a skin graft once pressure is relieved.

Fasciotomy in the limbs is usually performed by a surgeon under general or regional anesthesia. An incision is made in the skin, and a small area of fascia is removed where it will best relieve pressure.

Plantar fasciotomy is an endoscopic procedure. The physician makes two small incisions on either side of the heel. An endoscope is inserted in one incision to guide the physician. A tiny knife is inserted in the other. A portion of the fascia near the heel is removed. The incisions are then closed.

In addition to scar formation, there is a possibility that the surgeon may need to use a skin graft to close the wound. Sometimes when closing the fascia again in another surgical procedure, the muscle is still too large to close it completely. A small bulge is visible but is not harmful. It takes a much longer time to heal and, in some cases, takes several months.

== See also ==
- List of surgeries by type
- Ischemia-reperfusion injury of the appendicular musculoskeletal system
