= Range of motion (exercise machine) =

Type of physical therapy devices

Range of motion (ROM) is when a person has become injured in some way, most times the doctor's advice the patients to exercise and stretch the back muscles. For this purpose a form of exercises called range of motion exercises which are used to keep the muscles and joints in the patients back strong and flexible. These exercises can be done by the patient himself, or with a physical therapist. If these exercises are done alone they would be called active range of motion (AROM) exercises and if they require assistance they would be called active-assisted range of motion (AAROM) exercises.

A range of motion exercise machine won the 1991 Popular Science award for "Best of what's new" in leisure products.

== Users ==
Range of motion therapy is used largely for two distinct subgroups: temporary users and long term users.

=== Temporary users ===
Typically, a temporary user of ROM therapy is affected by a cause that will be resolved in the short term. These causes can be varied but mainly fall into three categories.

1. Injury
2. Surgery
3. Temporary immobility

In each case the user is expected to make a full recovery, and over time will no longer need ROM to ensure the proper function of their musculoskeletal structure.

=== Long-term users ===
A long-term range of motion user will usually need ROM therapy for life. These are users affected by permanent disability that ROM will not resolve. In large part long-term users continue ROM therapy daily for the quality of life improvements they see. Users typically suffer from,

1. Spinal cord injury
2. Multiple sclerosis
3. Parkinson's disease
4. Arthritis
5. Wheelchair users
6. TBI
7. Stroke
8. Daily ROM exercise

One of the major benefits of range of motion therapy for those users confined to wheelchairs is the daily movement of their limbs. This movement helps circulate the blood to extremities helping reduce the risks of blood clots, sores, and muscle tone reduction. With the help of ROM therapy, quality of life for such users can be greatly improved. For elderly users, a ROM therapy program will help improve their quality of life though exercise.

== Range of motion exercises ==
Range of motion exercise refers to activity aimed to improving movement of a specific joint. This motion is influenced by several structures: configuration of bone surfaces within the joint, joint capsule, ligaments, tendons, and muscles acting on the joint. Range of motion exercises are also called "ROM" exercises. There are three types of ROM exercises: passive, active, and active assists. Passive range of motion is movement applied to a joint solely by another person or persons or a passive motion machine. When passive range of motion is applied, the joint of an individual receiving exercise is completely relaxed. At the same time, the outside force moves the body part, such as a leg or arm, throughout the available range. Injury, surgery, or immobilization of a joint may affect the normal joint range of motion.

Active range of motion is the movement of a joint provided entirely by the individual performing the exercise. In this case, there is no outside force aiding in the movement. Active assist range of motion is described as a joint receiving partial assistance from an outside force. This range of motion may result from the majority of motion applied by an exerciser or by the person or persons assisting the individual. It also may be a half-and-half effort on the joint from each source.

== Types of passive range of motions ==
- Head and neck exercises
- Shoulder and elbow exercises
- Forearm and wrist exercises
- Hand and finger exercises
- Hip and knee exercises
- Ankle and foot exercises

== Medical devices ==
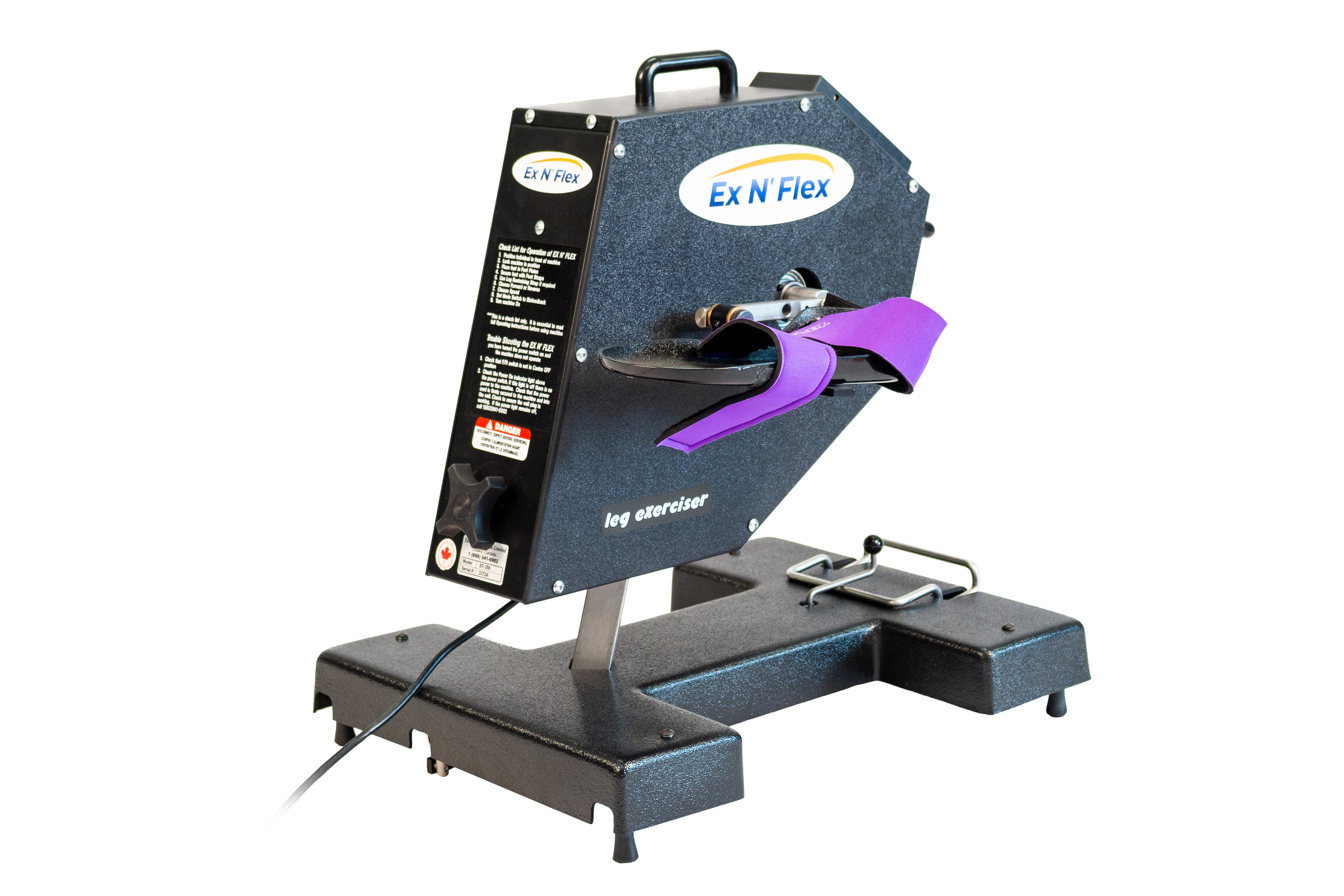
Ex N' Flex Active/Passive Range of Motion medical device, Model EF-250. Manufactured in Canada by Tecogics Scientific Ltd.

There are several Range of Motion medical devices on the market. Designed with the goal of facilitating repetitive ROM therapy, they are mainly employed by users who require long term ROM therapy in a home setting where access to a Physiotherapist for daily ROM therapy is not feasible. In the context of Long Term users, there are a small variety of ROM Therapy devices on the market designed for home use.

Not all devices seen on the market are Medical Devices, something prospective users should be aware of before purchasing their new ROM device. Due to the niche market of ROM therapy devices, the manufacturing market is rather small. These ROM therapy devices are designed to be either Active, Passive, or Active/Passive in nature. Costs range from $3,000-$15,000 for motorized Active/Passive devices, while non motorized devices can range from $200-$5,000 depending on supplier. Purchasing direct from a manufacture is difficult, but some do allow private sales direct to users.

== ROM therapy and COVID-19 ==
The global COVID-19 Pandemic has introduced more people to Range of Motion therapy. Due to the varying global lockdowns, many people became significantly less mobile and began to lose their ROM. This was especially prevalent in Long Term Care homes where elderly residents where confined to their rooms, there by losing the ability to actively move. This new sedentary lifestyle has led to an increase demand for ROM therapy in the hopes of getting elderly patients their range of motion back.
