= Ischemia-reperfusion injury of the appendicular musculoskeletal system =

Ischemia-reperfusion (IR) tissue injury is the resultant pathology from a combination of factors, including tissue hypoxia, followed by tissue damage associated with re-oxygenation. IR injury contributes to disease and mortality in a variety of pathologies, including myocardial infarction, ischemic stroke, acute kidney injury, trauma, circulatory arrest, sickle cell disease and sleep apnea. Whether resulting from traumatic vessel disruption, tourniquet application, or shock, the extremity is exposed to an enormous flux in vascular perfusion during a critical period of tissue repair and regeneration. The contribution of this ischemia and subsequent reperfusion on post-traumatic musculoskeletal tissues is unknown; however, it is likely that similar to cardiac and kidney tissue, IR significantly contributes to tissue fibrosis.

== Definitions ==
- "Ischemia": an inadequate blood supply to an organ or part of the body.
- "Reperfusion": the restoration of blood flow to an organ or tissue after having been blocked.

== Mechanisms and basic science ==
=== IR and biomarkers ===
Serum lactate level is a proxy measure of tissue oxygenation. When tissues do not have adequate oxygen delivery (i.e., are ischemic), they revert to less efficient metabolic processes, producing lactic acid.

Myoglobin is released from damaged muscle, as in the case of ischemia.

Serum creatinine and BUN may be elevated in the setting of acute kidney injury.

=== IR and stem cells ===
While some investigations suggest a possible beneficial effect of mesenchymal stem cells on heart and kidney reperfusion injury, to date, none have explored the role of stem cells in muscle tissue exposed to ischemia-reperfusion injury.

Stem cells have been implicated in the regeneration of skeletal muscle after traumatic and blast injuries, and have been shown to hone to muscle damaged after exercise.

== Clinical implications ==
- Systemic effects of IR injury

During periods of ischemia, cellular break down products accumulate in the local tissue. Once reperfusion occurs, these cellular products are returned to the systemic circulation, and are exposed to other organs. Organs involved in filtration (e.g., the kidneys and the liver), may be overwhelmed by the high load of cellular break down products, and face injury themselves (e.g., acute kidney injury).

- Tissue swelling and fasciotomy

Following ischemia, reperfusion induces local tissue swelling. Tissue that swells within a confined space (e.g., muscle within its overlaying fascia) is susceptible to compartment syndrome in this situation. Recognizing this, surgeons frequently prophylactically release (i.e., incise) fascia of arm and leg fascial compartments after repair of a proximal vascular injury.

== Tourniquets ==
- Pneumatic / Surgical

Pneumatic, surgical tourniquets are frequently applied in the controlled environment of the operating room in order to control blood loss during an upper or lower extremity operative case. Aside from lower blood loss in itself, this improves visualization and surgical efficiency. Modern examples are found in many different sizes to accommodate different patients and sites of applications, with adult cuffs approximately 4″ wide. This distributes the pressure over, generally, a broader area than field (emergency, combat) tourniquets. The cuff is typically attached to an adjustable pneumatic pump with a built-in timer. Surgical tourniquet times in excess of two hours have been associated with an increased risk of nerve damage (e.g., neuropraxia), likely related to both direct nerve compression as well as decreased arterial inflow and oxygenation. The ischemia-reperfusion injury associated with surgical tourniquets is typically not clinically apparent when used for less than two hours.

- Field / Combat

Emergency field tourniquets have been used for many centuries, and have seen a resurgence in the recent combat operations in Afghanistan and Iraq, as well as expanded use in civilian trauma and mass casualty settings. Expedient and widespread tourniquet use in the modern combat setting is frequently cited as a primary driver for increased survival following major battlefield trauma. These tourniquets are often 1–2″ in width, which concentrates the pressure to a narrow band of tissue. They can result in tissue necrosis if kept in place for long periods, and should only be applied after other methods to control bleeding (e.g., elevation or direct pressure to the wound) have failed, except in settings where time does not allow waiting. Generally, tissue distal to a field tourniquet that has been in place for greater than 6 hours is considered likely to be non-viable.

- Tourniquet equivalents

In the same way that external compression tourniquets reduce or eliminate arterial blood flow, aortic cross clamping has the same effect. The resuscitative endovascular balloon occlusion of the aorta (REBOA) device achieves this as well. By design, these devices induce ischemia to the lower extremities (as a secondary effect, or less commonly as their primary use). Releasing the cross clamp or removing the REBOA initiates reperfusion, and IR injury to the lower extremities may follow.

== Treatment approaches ==
Available hind limb IR animal model are either artery vein ligation or tourniquet application (by rubber band or O-ring). Possible treatments are the application of IR related-pathway derived drug/inhibitor and cell therapy. The study has been done a role for p53 in activating necrosis. During oxidative stress, p53 accumulates in the mitochondrial matrix and triggers mitochondrial permeability transition pore (PTP) opening. To the end of this, necrosis occurs by physical interaction with the PTP regulator cyclophilin D (CypD). The mitochondrial p53-CypD axis as an important contributor to oxidative stress-induced necrosis and implicates in disease pathology and possible treatment. Cyclosporine A, known as a potent the mitochondrial permeability transition pore (mPTP) opening inhibitor and extremely powerful in protecting cardiomyocytes from IR, normalized ROS production, decreased inflammation, and restored mitochondrial coupling during aortic cross-clamping in rat hindlimb IR model.

== See also ==
- Reperfusion injury
- Reperfusion therapy
