= Crush injury =

Injury due to external compression of the body

- Specialty: Emergency medicine

A crush injury is injury by an object that causes compression of the body. This form of injury is rare in normal civilian practice, but common following a natural disaster. Other causes include industrial accidents, road traffic collisions, building collapse, accidents involving heavy plant, disaster relief or terrorist incidents.

== Presentation ==
=== Complications ===
- Hypovolaemic shock. Loss of plasma volume across damaged cell membranes and capillary walls can lead directly to severe hypovolaemia. Shock can develop from myocardial depression following release of intracellular electrolytes. In addition, as a result of the mechanism of injury, blood loss from pelvic or long bone fractures may also co-exist.
- Hyperkalaemia and electrolyte imbalance. Disruption of cell membranes can result in a significant release of potassium, which is a largely intracellular cation that can precipitate cardiac arrest. Sequestration of plasma calcium into injured tissue can lead to a relative hypocalcaemia, which may worsen disruption of clotting abilities and shock. Metabolic acidosis may result from reperfusion injury and hypoperfusion related to shock.
- Compartment syndrome. Compartment syndrome is a common complication of crush injury as a consequence of oedematous tissue injury, redistribution of fluid into the intracellular compartment and bleeding. Established compartment syndrome may result in worsened systemic crush syndrome and irreversible muscle cell death.
- Acute kidney injury. Release of myoglobin by injured muscle leads to rhabdomyolysis coupled with shock leads to a significant rate of acute kidney injury, estimated as up to 15%. Acute kidney injury leads to a significantly higher mortality.

== Pathophysiology ==
Crush syndrome is a systemic result of skeletal muscle injury and breakdown and subsequent release of cell contents. The severity of crush syndrome is dependent on the duration and magnitude of the crush injury as well as the bulk of muscle affected. It can result from both short-duration, high-magnitude injuries (such as being crushed by a building) or from low-magnitude, long-duration injuries such as coma or drug-induced immobility.

== Treatment ==
Early fluid resuscitation reduces the risk of kidney failure, reduces the severity of hyperkalaemia and may improve outcomes in isolated crush injury.

For casualties with isolated crush injury who are haemodynamically stable, large-volume crystalloid fluid resuscitation reduces the severity of and reduces the risk of acute kidney injury.

== See also ==
- Crush syndrome
