= Carbonic anhydrase 3 =

Enzyme found in humans

CA3

Identifiers
- Aliases: CA3, CAIII, Car3, carbonic anhydrase 3
- External IDs: OMIM: 114750; MGI: 88270; GeneCards: CA3
Available structures
PDB	Ortholog search: PDBe RCSB
PDB	List of PDB id codes 1Z93, 1Z97, 2HFW, 3UYN, 3UYQ
Enzyme activity
EC #	BRENDA	ExPASy	KEGG	MetaCyc
4.2.1.1	↗	↗	↗	↗

Gene location (Human)
Chr.	Chromosome 8 (human)
Band	8q21.2	Start	85,373,436 bp
Band	8q21.2	End	85,449,040 bp

Gene location (Mouse)
Chr.	Chromosome 3 (mouse)
Band	3 A1|3 3.22 cM	Start	14,928,572 bp
Band	3 A1|3 3.22 cM	End	14,937,583 bp
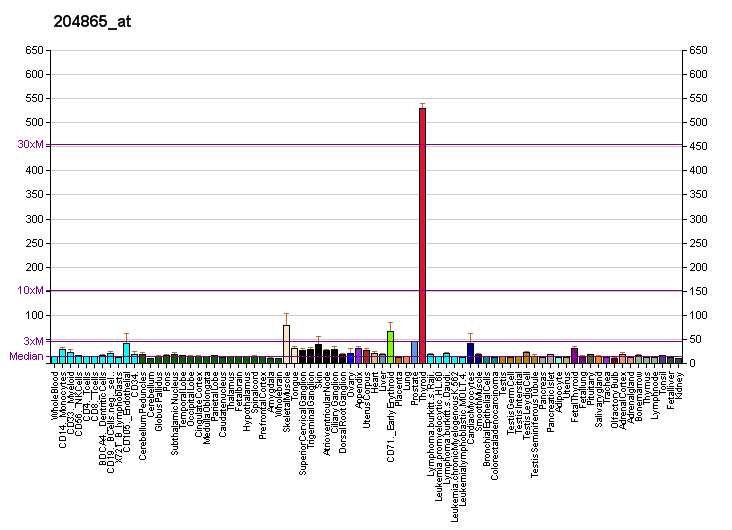
RNA expression pattern
Bgee	Human / Mouse (ortholog); Top expressed in: Skeletal muscle tissue of rectus abdominis; muscle of thigh; vastus lateralis muscle; biceps brachii; Skeletal muscle tissue of biceps brachii; thoracic diaphragm; gastrocnemius muscle; glutes; triceps brachii muscle; body of tongue / Top expressed in: intercostal muscle; subcutaneous adipose tissue; white adipose tissue; tunica adventitia of aorta; vestibular sensory epithelium; ankle; body of femur; brown adipose tissue; sternocleidomastoid muscle; vastus lateralis muscle; More reference expression data
BioGPS	More reference expression data
Gene ontology
Molecular function	carbonate dehydratase activity; phosphatase activity; zinc ion binding; nickel cation binding; metal ion binding; lyase activity; carbonic anhydrase
Cellular component	cytoplasm; cytosol
Biological process	bicarbonate transport; response to ethanol; response to oxidative stress; dephosphorylation; response to bacterium
Sources:Amigo / QuickGO
Orthologs
Databases	NCBI: entry; OMA: entry
Species	Human	Mouse
Entrez	761	12350
Ensembl	ENSG00000164879	ENSMUSG00000027559
UniProt	P07451	P16015
RefSeq (mRNA)	NM_005181	NM_007606
RefSeq (protein)	NP_005172	NP_031632
Location (UCSC)	Chr 8: 85.37 – 85.45 Mb	Chr 3: 14.93 – 14.94 Mb
PubMed search
- Wikidata
View/Edit Human	View/Edit Mouse

Carbonic anhydrase 3 is an enzyme that in humans is encoded by the CA3 gene.

Carbonic anhydrase III (CAIII) is a member of a multigene family (at least six separate genes are known) that encode carbonic anhydrase isozymes. These carbonic anhydrases are a class of metalloenzymes that catalyze the reversible hydration of carbon dioxide and are differentially expressed in a number of cell types. The expression of the CA3 gene is strictly tissue-specific and present at high levels in skeletal muscle and much lower levels in cardiac and smooth muscle. CA3 is insufficient in muscles of Myasthenia Gravis patients. A proportion of carriers of Duchenne muscle dystrophy have a higher CA3 level than normal. Autoantibodies to CA3 have been found to be significantly higher in patients with rheumatoid arthritis, systemic lupus erythematosus, and type 1 diabetes. The gene spans 10.3 kb and contains seven exons and six introns.
