= Unstable angina =

Chest pain due to heart muscles that is easily provoked

- Other names: Crescendo angina
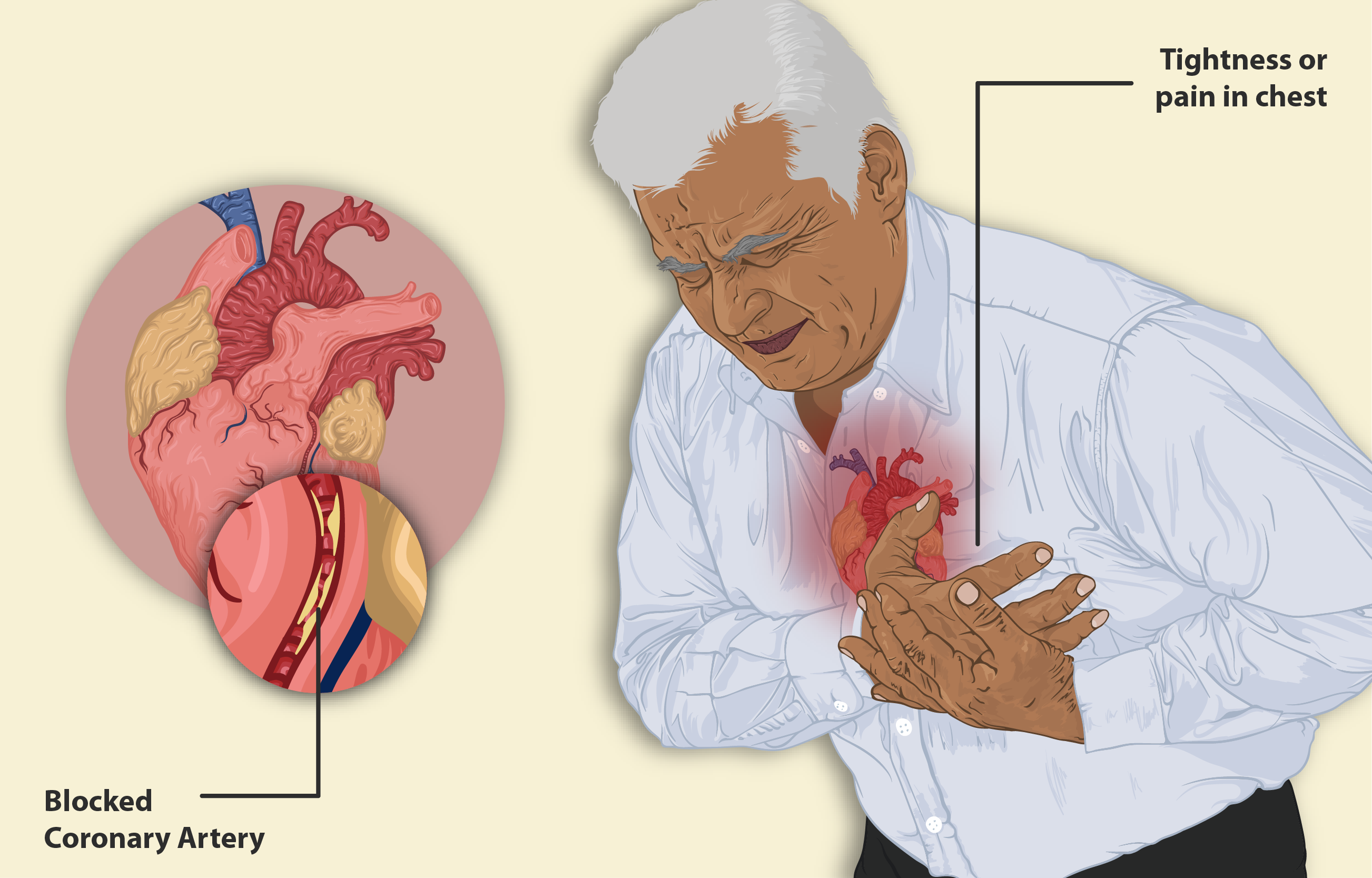
- Illustration depicting angina
- Specialty: Cardiology
- Symptoms: Chest pain or chest discomfort at rest or minimal exertion, or a new onset chest pain or discomfort on exertion.
- Complications: Coronary artery disease
- Causes: Each time a clot blocks blood flow in an artery, vasospasm

Unstable angina is a type of angina pectoris that is irregular or more easily provoked. It is classified as a type of acute coronary syndrome.

It can be difficult to distinguish unstable angina from non-ST elevation (non-Q wave) myocardial infarction. They differ primarily in whether the ischemia is severe enough to cause sufficient damage to the heart's muscular cells to release detectable quantities of a marker of injury, typically troponin T or troponin I. Unstable angina is considered to be present in patients with ischemic symptoms suggestive of an acute coronary syndrome and no change in troponin levels, with or without changes indicative of ischemia (e.g., ST segment depression or transient elevation or new T wave inversion) on electrocardiograms.

== Signs and symptoms ==
Symptoms of unstable angina are the same as those of stable angina, however the pattern of the symptoms changes. In unstable angina, symptoms related to decreased blood flow to the heart may appear on rest or on minimal exertion. The symptoms can last longer than those in stable angina, can be resistant to rest or medicine, and can get worse over time.

The cardinal symptom of critically decreased blood flow to the heart is chest pain, experienced as tightness, pressure, or burning. Localisation is most commonly around or over the chest and may radiate or be located to the arm, shoulder, neck, back, upper abdomen, or jaw. This may be associated with sweating, nausea, or shortness of breath. Previously the word "atypical" was used to describe chest pain not typically heart-related; however, this word is recommended against and has been replaced by "noncardiac" to describe chest pain that indicate a low likelihood of heart-related pain.

== Pathophysiology ==
The pathophysiology of unstable angina is controversial. Previously, unstable angina was assumed to be angina pectoris caused by disruption of an atherosclerotic plaque with partial thrombosis and possibly embolization or vasospasm leading to myocardial ischemia. However, sensitive troponin assays reveal rise of cardiac troponin in the bloodstream with episodes of even mild myocardial ischemia. Since unstable angina is assumed to occur in the setting of acute myocardial ischemia without troponin release, the concept of unstable angina is being questioned with some calling for retiring the term altogether.

== Diagnosis ==
Unstable angina is characterized by at least one of the following:

1. Occurs at rest or minimal exertion and usually lasts more than 20 minutes (if nitroglycerin is not administered)
2. Being severe (at least Canadian Cardiovascular Society Classification 3) and of new onset (i.e. within 1 month)
3. Occurs with a crescendo pattern (brought on by less activity, more severe, more prolonged or increased frequency than previously).

Fifty percent of people with unstable angina will have evidence of necrosis of the heart's muscular cells based on elevated cardiac serum markers such as creatine kinase isoenzyme (CK)-MB and troponin T or troponin I, and thus have a diagnosis of non-ST elevation myocardial infarction.

== Management ==
Nitroglycerin can be used immediately to dilate the venous system and reduce the circulating blood volume, therefore reducing the work and oxygen demand of the heart. In addition, nitroglycerin causes peripheral venous and artery dilation reducing cardiac preload and afterload. These reductions allow for decreased stress on the heart and therefore lower the oxygen demand of the heart's muscle cells.

Antiplatelet drugs such as aspirin and clopidogrel can reduce platelet aggregation at the unstable atherosclerotic plaque, as well as combining these with an anticoagulant such as a low molecular weight heparin, can reduce clot formation.

== See also ==
- Variant angina
