= Clubfoot =

Bone development disease

- Other names: Clubfeet, congenital talipes equinovarus (CTEV)
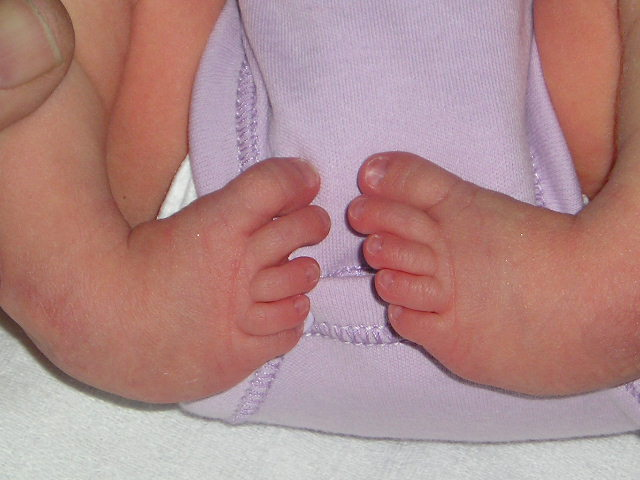
- Bilateral clubfeet
- Specialty: Orthopedics, podiatry
- Symptoms: Foot that is rotated inwards and downwards
- Usual onset: During early pregnancy
- Causes: Unknown
- Risk factors: Genetics, mothers who smoke cigarettes, male sex, ethnicity
- Diagnostic method: Physical examination, ultrasound during pregnancy
- Differential diagnosis: Metatarsus adductus
- Treatment: Ponseti method (manipulation, casting, cutting the Achilles tendon, braces), French method, surgery
- Prognosis: Good with proper treatment
- Frequency: 1 in 1,000

Clubfoot is a congenital or acquired defect where one or both feet are rotated inward and downward. Congenital clubfoot is the most common congenital malformation of the foot with an incidence of 1 per 1000 births. In approximately 50% of cases, clubfoot affects both feet, but it can present unilaterally causing one leg or foot to be shorter than the other. Most of the time, it is not associated with other problems. Without appropriate treatment, the foot deformity will persist and lead to pain and impaired ability to walk, which can have a dramatic impact on the quality of life.

The exact cause is usually not identified. Both genetic and environmental factors are believed to be involved. There are two main types of congenital clubfoot: idiopathic (80% of cases) and secondary clubfoot (20% of cases). The idiopathic congenital clubfoot is a multifactorial condition that includes environmental, vascular, positional, and genetic factors. There appears to be hereditary component for this birth defect given that the risk of developing congenital clubfoot is 25% when a first-degree relative is affected. In addition, if one identical twin is affected, there is a 33% chance the other one will be as well. The underlying mechanism involves disruption of the muscles or connective tissue of the lower leg, leading to joint contracture. Other abnormalities are associated 20% of the time, with the most common being distal arthrogryposis and myelomeningocele. The diagnosis may be made at birth by physical examination or before birth during an ultrasound exam.

The most common initial treatment is the Ponseti method, which is divided into two phases: 1) correcting of foot position and 2) casting at repeated weekly intervals. If the clubfoot deformity does not improve by the end of the casting phase, an Achilles tendon tenotomy can be performed. The procedure consists of a small posterior skin incision through which the tendon cut is made. In order to maintain the correct position of the foot, it is necessary to wear an orthopedic brace until 5 years of age.

Initially, the brace is worn nearly continuously and then just at night. In about 20% of cases, further surgery is required. Treatment can be carried out by a range of healthcare providers and can generally be achieved in the developing world with few resources.

Congenital clubfoot occurs in 1 to 4 of every 1,000 live births, making it one of the most common birth defects affecting the legs. About 80% of cases occur in developing countries where there is limited access to care. Clubfoot is more common in firstborn children and males. It is more common among Māori people, and less common among Chinese people.

== Epidemiology ==
Birth prevalence of clubfoot varies between 0.51 and 2.03/1,000 live births in low- and middle-income countries (LMICs).

Clubfoot disproportionally affects those in LMICs. About 80% of those with clubfoot, or approximately 100,000 children per year as of 2018, are born in LMICs.

== History ==
Pharaohs Siptah and Tutankhamun had clubfeet, and the condition appears in Egyptian paintings. Indian texts (c. 1000 BC) and Hippocrates (c. 400 BC) describe treatment. In 1823, Delpech presented a new procedure to treat the condition. The new method, known as tenotomy, involved the cutting of the Achilles tendon. The surgical procedure had complications such as infections.

Lord Byron was club-footed of his right foot. Some modern medical authors maintain that it was a consequence of infantile paralysis (poliomyelitis), and others that it was a dysplasia, a failure of the bones to form properly.

Talleyrand might have had a congenital clubfoot, which if his uncle did as well, could have been genetic. In any case, his handicap made him unable to follow his father into a military career, leaving the obvious career of the Church.

== Signs and symptoms ==
In clubfoot, feet are rotated inward and downward. The affected foot and leg may be smaller than the other, while in about half of cases, clubfoot affects both feet. Most of the time clubfoot is not associated with other problems.

Clubfoot can be diagnosed by ultrasound of the fetus in more than 60% of cases. The earliest week of gestation in which the condition is diagnosed with a high degree of confidence was the 12th and the latest was the 32nd. Not all patients were diagnosed at an early stage. In 29% of fetuses the first ultrasound examination failed to detect the deformity which subsequently became obvious at a later examination. Clubfoot was diagnosed between 12 and 23 weeks of gestation in 86% of children and between 24 and 32 weeks of gestation in the remaining 14%.

Without treatment the foot remains deformed and people walk on the sides or tops of their feet, which can cause calluses, foot infections, trouble fitting into shoes, pain, difficulty walking, and disability.

== Causes ==
Hypotheses about the precise cause of clubfoot vary. However, research has found that genetics, environmental factors or a combination of both are associated with this condition. Evidence suggests that the etiology of clubfoot is most likely multifactorial. A meta-analysis and systematic review found that the most clinically relevant risk factors for clubfoot were family history, paternal and maternal smoking, maternal obesity, gestational diabetes, amniocentesis, and the use of selective serotonin re-uptake inhibitors (SSRIs). Many findings agree that "it is likely there is more than one different cause and at least in some cases the phenotype may occur as a result of a threshold effect of different factors acting together." The most commonly associated conditions are distal arthrogryposis or myelomeningocele. The factors contributing to the development of clubfoot can be categorized as extrinsic and intrinsic factors.

=== Extrinsic factors ===
Factors that can influence the positioning of the fetal foot in utero include oligohydramnios, breech presentation, Müllerian anomalies, multiple gestation, amniotic band sequence, or amniocentesis at <15 weeks of gestation. In cases that impede normal growth and position for longstanding period of times, clubfoot can be accompanied with other deformations and may be associated with developmental hip dysplasia. The theory of fetal growth arrest was proposed by Von Volkmann in 1863, and has been verified by other authors since. According to this theory, intrinsic errors or environmental insults during gestation prevents the correction of an equinovarus to pronated foot.

Other researchers hypothesize that clubfoot may derive from external insults during gestation. For example, a research study found an alarmingly high incidence of club foot and limb contractures associated with iatrogenic amniotic leakage caused by early amniocentesis between the 11th and 12th week of gestation.

=== Intrinsic factors ===
- Chromosomal abnormalities found in 30% and 2% of complex clubfoot and isolated clubfoot respectively. These include trisomy 18, 13, 21, sex chromosome abnormalities, micro-deletions and duplications.
- Genetic Syndromes: Larsen, Gordon, Pierre-Robin, Meckel–Gruber, Roberts, Smith–Lemli–Opitz, TARP (Talipes equinovarus, Atrial septal defect, Robin sequence, Persistence of left superior vena cava).
- Skeletal Dysplasias: Ellis van Creveld syndrome, diastrophic dysplasia, chondrodysplasia punctata, camptomelic dysplasia, atelosteogenesis, and mesomelic dysplasia.
- Neuromuscular and Neurologic abnormalities: arthrogryposis multiplex congenita, myotonic dystrophy, spinal muscular atrophy, neural tube defects, holoprosencephaly, and hydranencephaly.

== Genetics ==
Clubfoot can be diagnosed prenatally as early as 13 weeks of gestation via ultrasound. According to the Society of Maternal-Fetal Medicine, a diagnostic testing for genetic causes is recommended when clubfoot is diagnosed prenatally. If prenatal screening is suspicious for aneuploidy, karyotype analysis or chromosomal microarray (CMA) may be performed. However, if patients decline diagnostic testing, Cell-Free DNA is another screening option to identify high-risk pregnancies for aneuploidy and it is not diagnostic. The incidence of chromosomal abnormalities in fetuses with prenatal diagnosis of clubfoot is relatively low. Overall, fetal ultrasound should be performed with a prenatal diagnosis of clubfoot in order to classify the condition as either complex or isolated because of the significant differences in rates of chromosomal abnormalities and outcomes between these two groups.

If one identical twin is affected, there is a 33% chance the other one will be as well.

Mutations in genes involved in muscle development are risk factors for clubfoot, specifically those encoding the muscle contractile complex (MYH3, TPM2, TNNT3, TNNI2 and MYH8). These can cause congenital contractures, including clubfoot, in distal arthrogryposis (DA) syndromes. Clubfoot can also be present in people with genetic conditions such as Loeys–Dietz syndrome and Ehlers–Danlos syndrome.

Genetic mapping and the development of models of the disease have improved understanding of developmental processes. Its inheritance pattern is explained as a heterogenous disorder using a polygenic threshold model. The PITX1-TBX4 transcriptional pathway has become key to the study of clubfoot. PITX1 and TBX4 are uniquely expressed in the hind limb.

== Diagnosis ==
Clubfoot is diagnosed through physical examination. Typically, babies are examined from head-to-toe shortly after they are born. There are four components of the clubfoot deformity:

1	Cavus: the foot has a high arch, or a caved appearance.
2	Adductus: the forefoot curves inwards toward the big toe.
3	Varus: the heel is inverted, or turned in, forcing one to walk on the outside of the foot. This is a natural motion but in clubfoot the foot is fixed in this position.
4	Equinus: the foot is pointed downward, forcing one to walk on tiptoe. This motion occurs naturally, but in clubfoot the foot is fixed in this position. This is because the Achilles tendon is tight and pulls the foot downwards.

Factors used to assess severity include the stiffness of the deformity (how much it can be corrected by manually manipulating the foot), the presence of skin creases at the arch and heel, and poor muscle consistency.

Sometimes, it is possible to detect clubfoot before birth using ultrasound. Prenatal diagnosis by ultrasound can allow parents to learn more about this condition and plan ahead for treatment after their baby is born.

More testing and imaging is typically not needed, unless there is concern for other associated conditions.

== Treatment ==
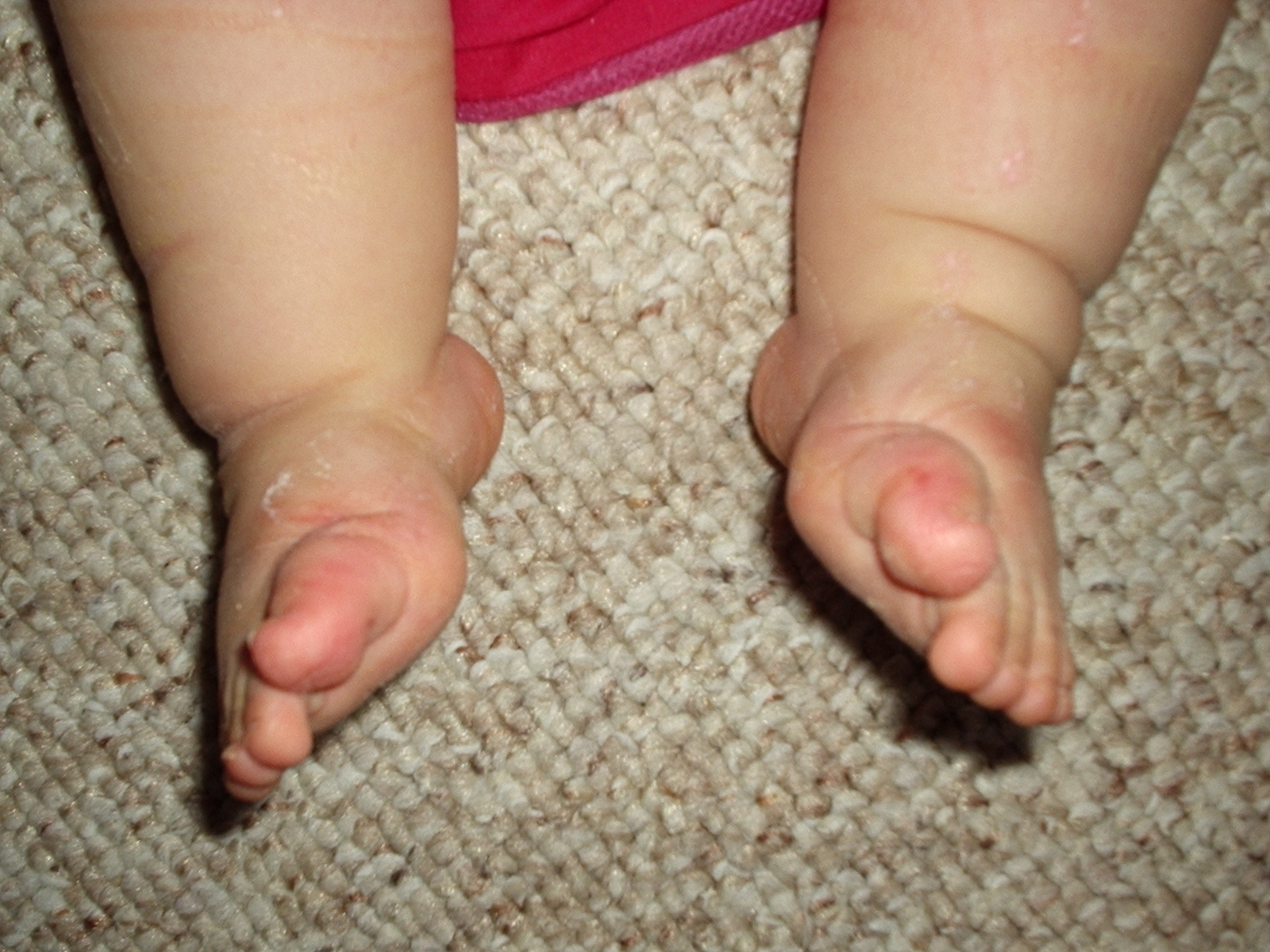
Clubfeet in the course of correction

Treatment is usually with some combination of the Ponseti method and French method. The Ponseti method involves a combination of casting, Achilles tendon release, and bracing. There are many commercial braces as well as a relatively inexpensive open-source hardware brace that can be made with a 3D printer. The Ponseti method is widely used and highly effective under the age of two.

The French method involves realignment, taping, and long-term home exercises and night splinting. It is also effective but outcomes vary and rely on heavy involvement of caregivers. Generally, the Ponseti method is preferred. Another technique, the Kite method, does not appear to be as effective. In about 20% of cases, additional surgery is required after initial treatment.

=== Ponseti method ===
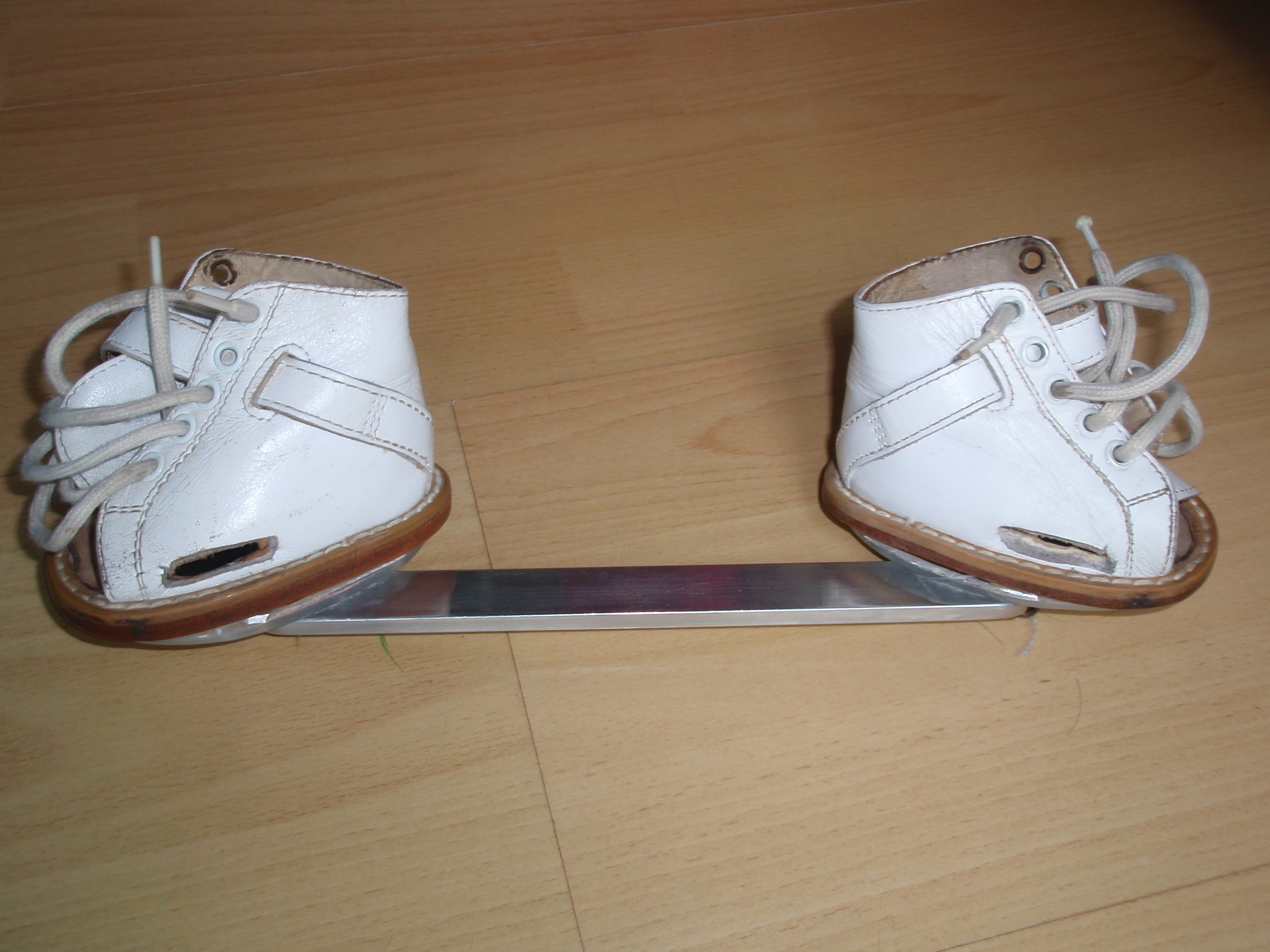
A foot abduction brace type Denis Browne bar. Various types of foot-abduction braces are used to hold the child's feet in the desired position.

The Ponseti method corrects clubfoot over the course of several stages.

- Serial casting: First, the foot is manually manipulated into an improved position and held in place with a long leg cast which extends from the toes up to the thigh. After a week this cast is removed, the foot is re-manipulated, and placed into a new cast. This process repeats and the foot is gradually reshaped over the course of 4-6 serial casts, although some feet may require additional casts.
  - The goal of the initial cast is to align the forefoot with the hindfoot. Ponseti describes the forefoot as pronated in relation to the hindfoot, so supinating the forefoot and elevating the first metatarsal improves this alignment.
  - Subsequent casts are applied after stretching the foot with a focus on abducting the forefoot with lateral pressure at the talus, to bring the navicular laterally and improve the alignment of the talonavicular joint. In contrast to the Kite method of casting, it is important to avoid constraining the calcaneocuboid joint. With each additional cast, the abduction is increased and this moves the hindfoot from varus into valgus. It is important to leave the ankle in equinus until the forefoot and hindfoot are corrected.
  - The final stage of casting is to correct the equinus. After fully abducting the forefoot with spontaneous correction of the hindfoot, an attempt is made to bring the ankle up and into dorsiflexion. The foot must have the ability to dorsiflex to at least 10 degrees past 0 (neutral, or L position), although 15 degrees or more is better and preferred. If the foot can not dorsiflex enough, the brace will not work/be tolerated. If it is determined the foot can not dorsiflex at least 10 degrees, the Achilles Tenotomy surgical procedure is performed.
- Achilles tendon release: At the end of the serial casting, most children have corrected cavus, adductus and varus deformities, but continue to have equinus deformity. To correct this, a procedure called an Achilles tendon release (commonly called Achilles tenotomy) is performed. Before the procedure, many centers place the child under sedation or monitored anesthesia care, although Ponseti recommended using local anesthetic alone. Next, the area around the heel is cleansed and numbed, and a small scalpel is used to cut the Achilles tendon. The incision is small so there is minimal bleeding and no need for stitches. The skin is covered with a small dressing, and the foot is placed into a final long leg cast in a fully corrected position. This cast is typically left in place for three weeks. During this time, the Achilles tendon will regrow in a lengthened position.
- Bracing: After successful correction is achieved through serial casting and Achilles tenotomy, the foot must be kept in a brace to prevent it from returning to the deformed position over the first few years of a child's life. The brace is made up of two shoes or boots that are connected to each other by a bar that is bent under the shoes at 10–15 degrees, or curved to create 10–15 degrees dorsiflexion. This device is also called a foot abduction brace (FAB) or more generally boots and bar (BnB). At first, the brace is worn full-time (23 hours per day) on both feet, regardless of whether the clubfoot affects one or two feet. After 3 months of 23/7 wear, the brace is worn less frequently by gradually reducing hours a couple at a time, every couple months so that hours are down to 12–14 per day at or around a year old. From this point on until at least 4–5 years, or even longer (6–9 years if needed), the brace is worn mostly while sleeping at night and during naps (12–14 hours per day). Bracing is essential in preventing recurrence of the deformity and is a major determinant of a child's long-term outcome.

The Ponseti method is highly effective with short-term success rates of 90%. However, anywhere from 14% to 41% of children experience a recurrence of the deformity, with as many as 56% requiring an additional surgery beyond the 10 year mark. The most common reason for this is inadequate adherence to bracing, such as not wearing the brace properly, not keeping it on for the recommended length of time, or not using it every day. Children who do not follow proper bracing protocol have up to seven times higher recurrence rates than those who follow bracing protocol, as the muscles around the foot can pull it back into the abnormal position. Low parental education level and failure to understand the importance of bracing is a major contributor to non-adherence. Relapses are managed by repeating the casting process. Relapsed feet may also require additional, more extensive surgeries and have a reduced chance of achieving subsequent correction. Furthermore, research has revealed the possibility of overcorrection after use of the Ponseti method.

Another reason for recurrence is a congenital muscle imbalance between the muscles that invert the ankle (tibialis posterior and tibialis anterior muscles) and the muscles that evert the ankle (peroneal muscles). This imbalance is present in approximately 20% of infants successfully treated with the Ponseti casting method, and makes them more prone to recurrence. This relapse is usually treated with Ponseti casting and can be done multiple times before resorting to surgery. If after all non-surgical casting and bracing options have been exhausted, and when the child is over four years of age (many doctors prefer to wait until after seven years old), this can be addressed with a surgery to transfer the tibialis anterior tendon from its medial attachment (on the navicula) to a more lateral position (on the lateral cuneiform). The surgery requires general anesthesia and subsequent casting while the tendon heals, but it is a relatively minor surgery that re-balances the muscles of the foot without disturbing any joints.

The impact of Ponseti management of clubfoot on mothers and caregivers has also been researched with studies finding mothers caring for children with congenital club foot report significantly lower levels of psychological health than mothers of healthy infants.

=== French method ===
The French method is a conservative, non-operative method of clubfoot treatment that involves daily physical therapy for the first two months followed by thrice-weekly physical therapy for the next four months and continued home exercises following the conclusion of formal physical therapy. During each physical therapy session the feet are manipulated, stretched, then taped to maintain any gains made to the feet's range of motion. Exercises may focus on strengthening the peroneal muscles, which is thought to contribute to long-term correction. After the two month mark, the frequency of physical therapy sessions can be weaned down to three times a week instead of daily, until the child reaches six months. After the conclusion of the physical therapy program, caregivers must continue performing exercises at home and splinting at night in order to maintain long-term correction.

Compared to the Ponseti method which uses rigid casts and braces, the French method uses tape which allows for some motion in the feet. Despite its goal to avoid surgery, the success rate varies and surgery may still be necessary. The Ponseti method is generally preferred over the French method.

=== Surgery ===
If non-operative treatments are unsuccessful or achieve incomplete correction of the deformity, surgery is sometimes needed. Surgery was more common prior to the widespread acceptance of the Ponseti method. The extent of surgery depends on the severity of the deformity. Usually, surgery is done at 9 to 12 months of age and the goal is to correct all the components of the clubfoot deformity at the time of surgery, but, in some cases, surgery occurs over a period of time to completely correct the affected area.

For feet with the typical components of deformity (cavus, forefoot adductus, hindfoot varus, and ankle equinus), the typical procedure is a Posteromedial Release (PMR) surgery. This is done through an incision across the medial side of the foot and ankle, that extends posteriorly, and sometimes around to the lateral side of the foot. In this procedure, it is typically necessary to release (cut) or lengthen the plantar fascia, several tendons, and joint capsules/ligaments. Typically, the important structures are exposed and then sequentially released until the foot can be brought to an appropriate plantigrade position. Specifically, it is important to bring the ankle to neutral, the heel into neutral, the midfoot aligned with the hindfoot (navicula aligned with the talus, and the cuboid aligned with the calcaneus). Once these joints can be aligned, thin wires are usually placed across these joints to hold them in the corrected position. These wires are temporary and left out through the skin for removal after 3–4 weeks.

Once the joints are aligned, tendons (typically the Achilles, posterior tibialis, and flexor halluces longus) are repaired at an appropriate length. The incision (or incisions) are closed with dissolvable sutures. The foot is then casted in the corrected position for 6–8 weeks. It is common to do a cast change with anesthesia after 3–4 weeks, so that pins can be removed and a mold can be made to fabricate a custom AFO brace. The new cast is left in place until the AFO is available. When the cast is removed, the AFO is worn to prevent the foot from returning to the old position.

For feet with partial correction of deformity with non-operative treatment, surgery may be less extensive and may involve only the posterior part of the foot and ankle. This might be called a posterior release. This is done through a smaller incision and may involve releasing only the posterior capsule of the ankle and subtalar joints, along with lengthening the Achilles tendon.

If only one foot is affected, after these surgeries, if desired, more treatment and surgery can be done to even out the legs. One option arrests a growth plate on the unaffected ankle, which will eventually allow the affected leg to grow to the length of the unaffected leg. Another option is to lengthen either the femur or tibia. This is achieved by surgically adding a lengthening bar to either bone. This is achieved by sawing the bone into two pieces, adding the bar, and partially closing the bone around the bar. With a lengthening device put onto the leg occasionally, this will lengthen the affected bone over time.

Surgery leaves residual scar tissue and typically there is more stiffness and weakness than with nonsurgical treatment. As the foot grows, there is potential for asymmetric growth that can result in recurrence of foot deformity that can affect the forefoot, midfoot, or hindfoot. Many patients do fine, but some require orthotics or additional surgeries. Long-term studies of adults with post-surgical clubfeet, especially those needing multiple surgeries, show that they may not fare as well in the long term. Some people may require additional surgeries as they age, though there is some dispute as to the effectiveness of such surgeries, in light of the prevalence of scar tissue present from earlier surgeries.

=== Developing world ===
Despite effective treatments, children in LMICs face many barriers such as limited access to equipment (specifically casting materials and abduction braces), shortages of healthcare professionals, and low education levels and socioeconomic status amongst caregivers and families. These factors make it difficult to detect and diagnose children with clubfoot, connect them to care, and train their caregivers to follow the proper treatment and return for follow-up visits. It is estimated that only 15% of those diagnosed with clubfoot receive treatment.

In an effort to reduce the burden of clubfoot in LMICs, there have been initiatives to improve early diagnosis, organize high-volume Ponseti casting centers, utilize mid-level practitioners and non-physician health workers, engage families in care, and provide local follow-up in the person's community.

== Cultural references ==
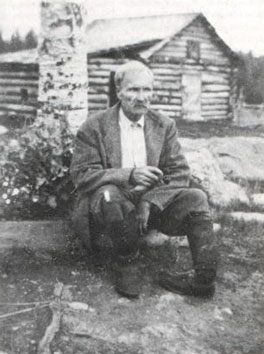
A well-known storyteller from Lapland, Juho "Nätti-Jussi" Nätti (surname can be translated as 'pretty') (1890–1964) was known for his stories but also his untreated left clubfoot. A story tells that "not even the devil himself could tell which way Nätti has gone" from footprints of snow.

- Hippolyte Tautain, the stableman at the Lion D'Or public house in the 1856 novel Madame Bovary by Gustave Flaubert, has clubfoot. Charles Bovary tries to correct it, but the procedure is unsuccessful, and Tautain must have an amputation.
- Philip Carey, the main character of the 1915 novel Of Human Bondage by W. Somerset Maugham, has clubfoot. It is a central theme of the work.
- Velma, a character in the 1941 film High Sierra, has clubfoot. It is successfully treated with surgery.
- Gimpy, a coworker of the main character in the 1959 science fiction short story "Flowers for Algernon" by Daniel Keyes, has clubfoot.
- Kashiwagi, a character in the 1956 novel The Temple of the Golden Pavilion by Yukio Mishima, has clubfoot. It parallels the main character, Mizoguchi, who has a stutter.
- Johnson, a character in the 1965 short story "The Lame Shall Enter First" by Flannery O'Connor, has clubfoot. It is a major symbol in the story.
- The main character of the 1974 science fiction novel The Bladerunner by Alan E. Nourse has clubfoot.
- The main character of the 1985 novel Perfume: The Story of a Murderer by Patrick Süskind, has clubfoot. It causes a limp.
- Senji, a character in the 1987 to 1991 fantasy book series The Mallorean by David Eddings, has clubfoot.
- Kwai Geuk-Chat, a character in the 1993 film Once Upon a Time in China III, which is part of the 1991 to 1997 Once Upon a Time in China series, has clubfoot. He is nicknamed "Clubfoot Seven Chiu-Tsat" – "Clubfoot" because of his foot, and "Seven Chiu-Tsat" because he is the seventh member of the character Chiu Tin-bak's apprentices, disciples, and henchmen.
- Mordred, King of Dumonia, a character in the 1995 to 1997 historical fantasy book series The Warlord Chronicles by Bernard Cornwell, has clubfoot. It is often used as a symbol for his weakness as a ruler.
- The main character of the animated series, Waynehead (1996), based on creator Damon Wayan's childhood, had a large foot brace due to his club foot.
- Charlie Wilcox, the main character of the 2000 children's book of the same name by Sharon McKay, has clubfoot.
- Vulcan the blacksmith, a character in the 2001 novel The Secrets of Vesuvius, which is part of the 2001 to 2009 historical fiction series The Roman Mysteries by Caroline Lawrence, has clubfoot.
- Ada, the main character of the 2016 children's book The War That Saved My Life by Kimberly Brubaker Bradley, has clubfoot. Her mother emotionally and physically abuses her because of it.
- Larys Strong, called "the Clubfoot", first appears in George R. R. Martin's 2013 fantasy novella The Princess and the Queen, part of A Song of Ice and Fire. He is the secretive and sly master of whisperers for King Viserys I Targaryen and his successor Aegon II Targaryen. Larys's character was later expanded on in the novel Fire & Blood (2018) and its television adaptation House of the Dragon (2022).
- In the 2024 series The Penguin, Oswald Cobb, the main character, has a club foot that causes him to walk with a limp.
