= Acute coronary syndrome =

Dysfunction of the heart muscles due to insufficient blood flow

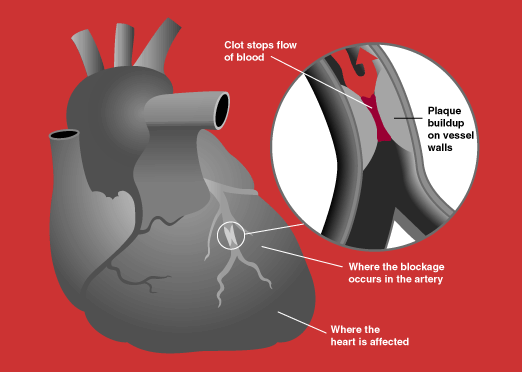
- Blockage of a coronary artery
- Specialty: Cardiology, emergency medicine
- Symptoms: Chest pain, sweating, nausea

Acute coronary syndrome (ACS) is a syndrome due to decreased blood flow in the coronary arteries such that part of the heart muscle is unable to function properly or dies. The most common symptom is centrally located pressure-like chest pain, often radiating to the left shoulder or angle of the jaw, and associated with nausea and sweating. Many people with acute coronary syndromes present with symptoms other than chest pain, particularly women, older people, and people with diabetes mellitus.

Acute coronary syndrome is subdivided in three scenarios depending primarily on the presence of electrocardiogram (ECG) changes and blood test results (a change in cardiac biomarkers such as troponin levels): ST elevation myocardial infarction (STEMI), non-ST elevation myocardial infarction (NSTEMI), or unstable angina. STEMI is characterized by complete blockage of a coronary artery resulting in necrosis of part of the heart muscle indicated by ST elevation on ECG, NSTEMI is characterized by a partially blocked coronary artery resulting in necrosis of part of the heart muscle that may be indicated by ECG changes, and unstable angina is characterised by ischemia of the heart muscle that does not result in cell injury or necrosis.

ACS should be distinguished from stable angina, which develops during physical activity or stress and resolves at rest. In contrast with stable angina, unstable angina occurs suddenly, often at rest or with minimal exertion, or at lesser degrees of exertion than the individual's previous angina ("crescendo angina"). New-onset angina is also considered unstable angina, since it suggests a new problem in a coronary artery.

== Signs and symptoms ==
Symptoms of the acute coronary syndromes are similar. The cardinal symptom of critically decreased blood flow to the heart is chest pain, experienced as tightness, pressure, or burning. Localization is most commonly around or over the chest and may radiate or be located to the arm, shoulder, neck, back, upper abdomen, or jaw. This may be associated with sweating, nausea, or shortness of breath. Previously, the word "atypical" was used to describe chest pain not typically heart-related, however, this word is not recommended and has been replaced by "noncardiac" to describe chest pain that indicates a low likelihood of heart-related pain.

In unstable angina, symptoms may appear on rest or on minimal exertion. The symptoms can last longer than those in stable angina, can be resistant to rest or medicine, and can get worse over time.

Though ACS is usually associated with coronary thrombosis, it can also be associated with cocaine use. Chest pain with features characteristic of cardiac origin (angina) can also be precipitated by profound anemia, brady- or tachycardia (excessively slow or rapid heart rate), low or high blood pressure, severe aortic valve stenosis (narrowing of the valve at the beginning of the aorta), pulmonary artery hypertension and a number of other conditions.

== Pathophysiology ==
In those who have ACS, atheroma rupture is most commonly found 60% when compared to atheroma erosion (30%), thus causes the formation of thrombus which block the coronary arteries. Plaque rupture is responsible for 60% in ST elevated myocardial infarction (STEMI) while plaque erosion is responsible for 30% of the STEMI and vice versa for Non ST elevated myocardial infarction (NSTEMI). In plaque rupture, the content of the plaque is lipid rich, collagen poor, with abundant inflammation which is macrophage predominant, and covered with a thin fibrous cap. Meanwhile, in plaque erosion, the plaque is rich with extracellular matrix, proteoglycan, glycoaminoglycan, but without fibrous caps, no inflammatory cells, and no large lipid core. After the coronary arteries are unblocked, there is a risk of reperfusion injury due spreading inflammatory mediators throughout the body. Investigations is still underway on the role of cyclophilin D in reducing the reperfusion injury.

Other, less common, causes of acute coronary syndrome include spontaneous coronary artery dissection, ischemia in the absence of obstructive coronary artery disease (INOCA), and myocardial infarction in the absence of obstructive coronary artery disease (MINOCA).

== Diagnosis ==
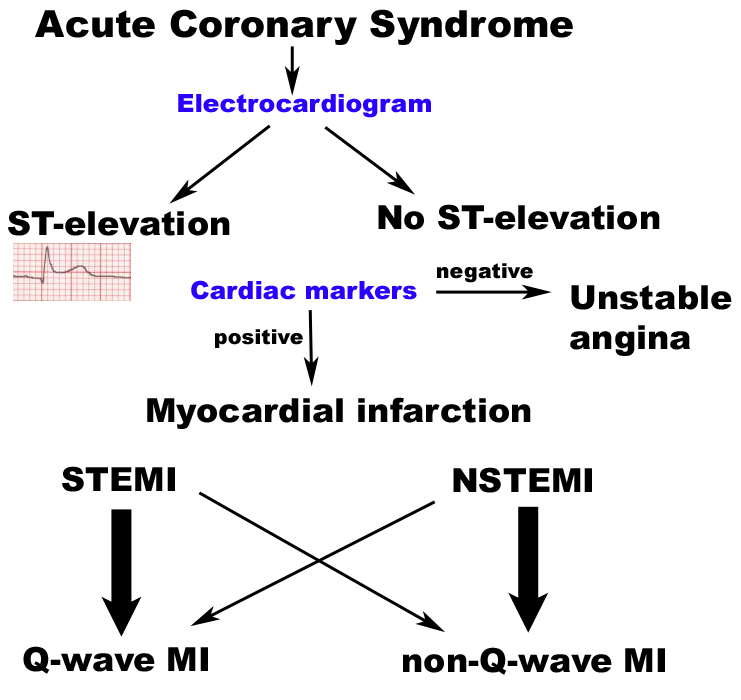
Classification of acute coronary syndromes.

=== Electrocardiogram ===
In the setting of acute chest pain, the electrocardiogram (ECG or EKG) is the investigation that most reliably distinguishes between various causes. The ECG should be done as early as practicable, including in the ambulance if possible. ECG changes indicating acute heart damage include: ST elevation, new left bundle branch block and ST depression amongst others. The absence of ECG changes does not immediately distinguish between unstable angina and NSTEMI.

=== Blood tests ===
Change in levels of cardiac biomarkers, such as troponin I and troponin T, are indicative of myocardial infarction including both STEMI and NSTEMI, however their levels are not affected in unstable angina.

=== Prediction scores ===
A combination of cardiac biomarkers and risk scores, such as HEART score and TIMI score, can help assess the possibility of myocardial infarction in the emergency setting.

== Prevention ==
Acute coronary syndrome often reflects a degree of damage to the coronaries by atherosclerosis. Primary prevention of atherosclerosis is controlling the risk factors: healthy eating, exercise, treatment for hypertension and diabetes, avoiding smoking and controlling cholesterol levels; in patients with significant risk factors, aspirin has been shown to reduce the risk of cardiovascular events. Secondary prevention is discussed in myocardial infarction.

After a ban on smoking in all enclosed public places was introduced in Scotland in March 2006, there was a 17% reduction in hospital admissions for acute coronary syndrome. 67% of the decrease occurred in non-smokers.

== Treatment ==
People with presumed ACS are typically treated with aspirin, clopidogrel or ticagrelor, nitroglycerin, and, if the chest discomfort persists, morphine. Other analgesics such as nitrous oxide are of unknown benefit. Angiography is recommended in those who have either new ST elevation or a new left or right bundle branch block on their ECG. Unless the person has low oxygen levels additional oxygen does not appear to be useful.

=== STEMI ===
If the ECG confirms changes suggestive of myocardial infarction (ST elevation in specific leads, a new left bundle branch block or a true posterior MI pattern), thrombolytics may be administered or percutaneous coronary intervention may be performed. In the former, medication is injected that stimulates fibrinolysis, destroying blood clots obstructing the coronary arteries. In the latter, a flexible catheter is passed via the femoral or radial artery and advanced to the heart to identify blockages in the coronary arteries. When occlusions are found, they can be intervened upon mechanically with angioplasty and usually stent deployment if a lesion, termed the culprit lesion, is thought to be causing myocardial damage. Data suggest that rapid triage, transfer and treatment is essential. The time frame for door-to-needle thrombolytic administration according to American College of Cardiology (ACC) guidelines should be within 30 minutes, whereas the door-to-balloon percutaneous coronary intervention (PCI) time should be less than 90 minutes. It was found that thrombolysis is more likely to be delivered within the established ACC guidelines among patients with STEMI as compared to PCI according to a 2009 case control study.

=== NSTEMI and NSTE-ACS ===
If the ECG does not show typical changes consistent with STEMI, the term "non-ST segment elevation ACS" (NSTE-ACS) may be used and encompasses "non-ST elevation MI" (NSTEMI) and unstable angina.

The accepted management of unstable angina and acute coronary syndrome is therefore empirical treatment with aspirin, a second platelet inhibitor such as clopidogrel, prasugrel or ticagrelor, and heparin (usually a low-molecular weight heparin), with intravenous nitroglycerin and opioids if the pain persists. The heparin-like drug known as fondaparinux appears to be better than enoxaparin.

If there is no evidence of ST segment elevation on the electrocardiogram, delaying urgent angioplasty until the next morning is not inferior to doing so immediately. Using statins in the first 14 days after ACS reduces the risk of further ACS.

Cocaine-associated ACS should be managed in a manner similar to other patients with acute coronary syndrome except beta blockers should not be used and benzodiazepines should be administered early.

== Prognosis ==
=== Prediction scores ===
The TIMI risk score can identify high risk patients in ST-elevation and non-ST segment elevation MI ACS and has been independently validated.

Based on a global registry of 102,341 patients, the GRACE risk score estimates in-hospital, 6 months, 1 year, and 3-year mortality risk after a heart attack. It takes into account clinical (blood pressure, heart rate, EKG findings) and medical history. Nowadays, GRACE risk score is also used within non-ST elevation ACS patients as a high-risk criteria(GRACE score > 140), which may favor early invasive strategy within 24 hours of the heart attack.

=== Biomarkers ===
Coronary CT angiography combined with troponin levels is also helpful to triage those who are susceptible to ACS. F-fluoride positron emission tomography is also helpful in identifying those with high risk, lipid-rich coronary plaques.

=== Day of admission ===
Studies have shown that for ACS patients, weekend admission is associated with higher mortality and lower utilization of invasive cardiac procedures, and those who did undergo these interventions had higher rates of mortality and complications than their weekday counterparts. This data leads to the possible conclusion that access to diagnostic/interventional procedures may be contingent upon the day of admission, which may impact mortality. This phenomenon is described as weekend effect.

== Research ==
A study published in 2024 found that women with acute coronary syndrome in India experience worse outcomes.
