= Chest pain =

Discomfort or pain in the chest as a medical symptom

- Other names: Pectoralgia, stethalgia, thoracalgia, thoracodynia
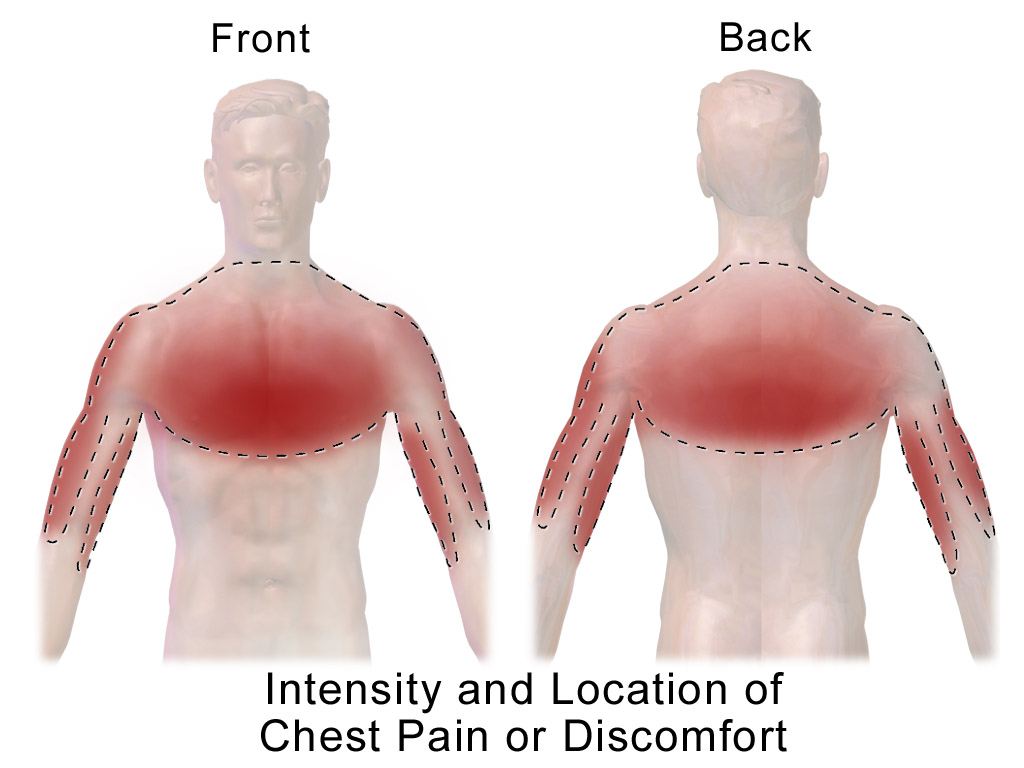
- Potential location of pain from a heart attack
- Specialty: Emergency medicine, internal medicine, cardiology
- Symptoms: Discomfort in the front of the chest
- Types: Cardiac, noncardiac
- Causes: Serious: Acute coronary syndrome (including heart attacks), pulmonary embolism, pneumothorax, pericarditis, aortic dissection, esophageal rupture Common: Gastroesophageal reflux disease, psychological problems such as anxiety disorders, depression, stress etc, muscle or skeletal pain, pneumonia, shingles
- Diagnostic method: Medical history, physical exam, medical tests
- Treatment: Based on the underlying cause
- Medication: Aspirin, nitroglycerin
- Prognosis: Depends on the underlying cause
- Frequency: ~5% of ER visits

Chest pain is pain or discomfort in the chest, typically the front of the chest. It may be described as sharp, dull, pressure, heaviness or squeezing. Associated symptoms may include pain in the shoulder, arm, upper abdomen, or jaw, along with nausea, sweating, or shortness of breath. It can be divided into heart-related and non-heart-related pain. Pain due to insufficient blood flow to the heart is also called angina pectoris. Those with diabetes or the elderly may have less clear symptoms.

Serious and relatively common causes include acute coronary syndrome such as a heart attack (31%), pulmonary embolism (2%), pneumothorax, pericarditis (4%), aortic dissection (1%) and esophageal rupture. Other common causes include gastroesophageal reflux disease (30%), muscle or skeletal pain (28%), pneumonia (2%), shingles (0.5%), pleuritis, traumatic and anxiety disorders. Determining the cause of chest pain is based on a person's medical history, a physical exam and other medical tests. About 3% of heart attacks, however, are initially missed.

Management of chest pain is based on the underlying cause. Initial treatment often includes the medications aspirin and nitroglycerin. The response to treatment does not usually indicate whether the pain is heart-related. When the cause is unclear, the person may be referred for further evaluation.

Chest pain represents about 5% of presenting problems to the emergency room. In the United States, about 8 million people go to the emergency department with chest pain a year. Of these, about 60% are admitted to either the hospital or an observation unit. The cost of emergency visits for chest pain in the United States is more than US$8 billion per year. Chest pain accounts for about 0.5% of visits by children to the emergency department.

== Signs and symptoms ==
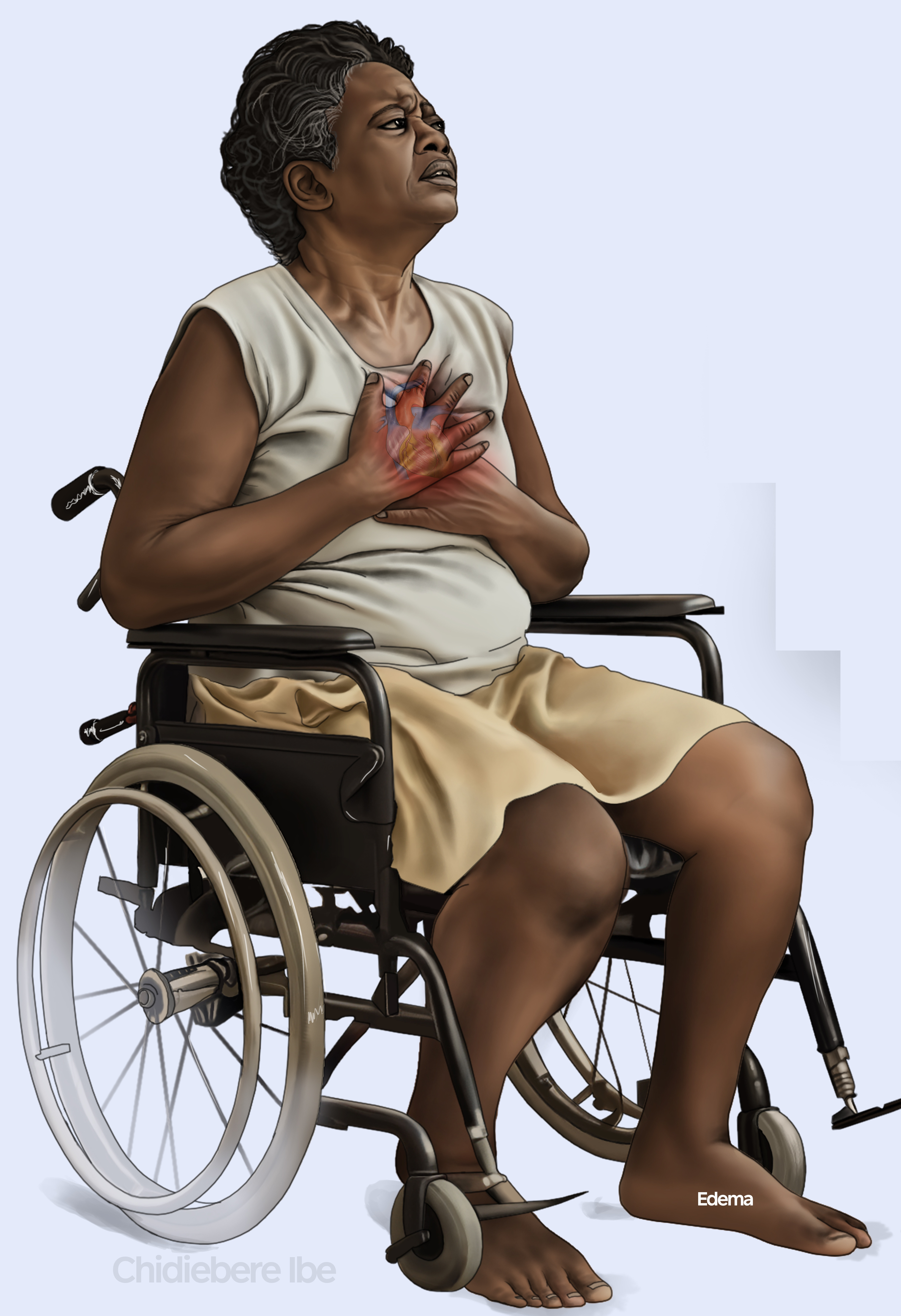
A woman clutching her chest, a common sign of a heart attack

Chest pain may present in different ways depending upon the underlying diagnosis. Chest pain may also vary from person to person based upon age, sex, weight, and other differences. Chest pain may present as a stabbing, burning, aching, sharp, or pressure-like sensation in the chest. Chest pain may also radiate, or move, to several other areas of the body. This may include the neck, left or right arms, cervical spine, back, and upper abdomen. Other associated symptoms with chest pain can include nausea, vomiting, dizziness, shortness of breath, anxiety, and sweating. The type, severity, duration, and associated symptoms of chest pain can help guide diagnosis and further treatment.

== Differential diagnosis ==
Causes of chest pain range from non-serious to life-threatening.

In adults the most common causes of chest pain include: gastrointestinal (42%), coronary artery disease (31%), musculoskeletal (28%), pericarditis (4%) and pulmonary embolism (2%). Other less common causes include: pneumonia, lung cancer, and aortic aneurysms. Psychogenic causes of chest pain can include panic attacks; however, this is a diagnosis of exclusion.

In children, the most common causes for chest pain are musculoskeletal (76–89%), exercise-induced asthma (4–12%), gastrointestinal illness (8%), and psychogenic causes (4%). Chest pain in children can also have congenital causes.

=== Cardiovascular ===
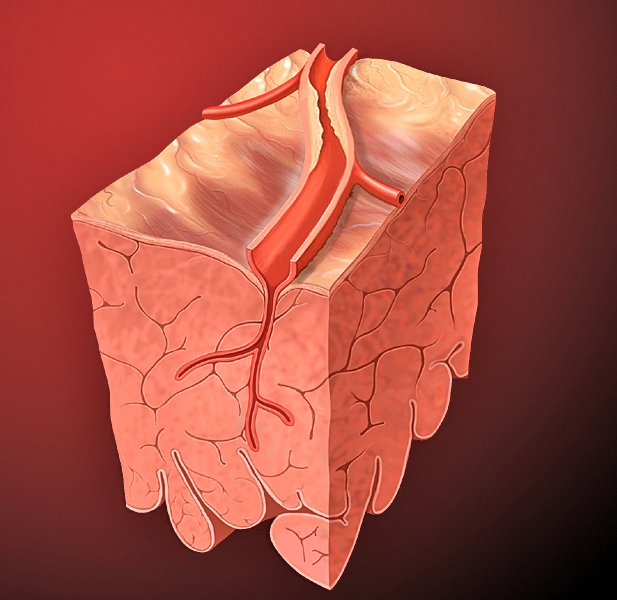
A blockage of coronary arteries can lead to a heart attack

- Acute coronary syndrome
  - Stable or unstable angina
  - Myocardial infarction ("heart attack"): People typically present with pressure or squeezing sensation over the chest in addition to sweating, nausea, vomiting, and weakness. Chest pain is more commonly associated with anterior infarction because of left ventricular impairment; inferior infarction is more commonly associated with nausea, vomiting, and excessive sweating due to irritation of vagus nerve; lateral infarction is associated with left arm pain.
- Prinzmetal's angina: Chest pain is caused by coronary vasospasm. It is more common in women younger than 50 years and has associations with tobacco, cocaine, or triptan use. People usually complain of chest pain at rest that is unrelated to stress or exertion. It is often relieved by cessation of the offending drug and the administration of nitrates or calcium channel blockers.
- Cocaine use: This condition is suspected when people with few risk factors for arteriosclerosis present with non-traumatic chest pain. Ingestion of cocaine can lead to vasoconstriction of coronary arteries, thus producing chest pain similar to heart attack. Symptoms can appear within one hour of cocaine use.
- Aortic stenosis: This condition occurs in individuals with underlying congenital bicuspid valve, aortic sclerosis, or a history of rheumatic fever. Chest pain usually happens during physical activity. Syncope is a late symptom. Signs and symptoms of heart failure may also be present. On auscultation, a loud ejection systolic murmur can be heard at the right second intercostal space with radiation to the carotid artery in the neck. Splitting of second heart sound is heard in severe stenosis.
- Hypertrophic cardiomyopathy: It is the hypertrophy of interventricular septum that causes outflow obstruction of the left ventricle. Dyspnea and chest pain commonly occur during daily activities. Syncope may also occur. On physical examination, significant findings include: loud systolic murmur and palpable triple apical impulse due to a palpable presystolic fourth heart sound.
- Aortic dissection is characterized by severe chest pain that radiates the back. It is usually associated with Marfan's syndrome and hypertension. On examination, the murmur of aortic insufficiency can be heard with unequal radial pulses.
- Pericarditis: This condition can be the result of viral infection such as coxsackie virus and echovirus, tuberculosis, autoimmune disease, uremia, and after myocardial infarction (Dressler syndrome). The chest pain is often pleuritic in nature (associated with respiration) which is aggravated when lying down and relieved on sitting forward, sometimes, accompanied by fever. On auscultation, pericardial friction rub can be heard.
- Cardiac tamponade: Cardiac tamponade occurs due to fluid accumulation in the pericardial space and typically presents with chest pain often accompanied by symptoms like dyspnea, hypotension, and pulsus paradoxus. Clinical signs include Beck's triad—hypotension, jugular venous distension, and muffled heart sounds.
- Arrhythmia: Atrial fibrillation and several other arrhythmias can cause chest pain.
- Myocarditis: Myocarditis often affects young men under 45, presenting with symptoms such as chest pain, rapid heartbeat, palpitations, difficulty breathing, and early heart failure signs. Approximately one-third experience sharp, squeezing chest pain, while nonspecific symptoms like fever, fatigue, and muscle aches may also occur. Common causes range from viral infections like Coxsackie and adenovirus to bacterial, fungal, chemical exposures, and autoimmune conditions such as lupus and rheumatoid arthritis.
- Mitral valve prolapse syndrome: Those affected are usually slim females presented with chest pain which is sharp in quality, localized at the apex, and relieved when lying down. Other symptoms include: shortness of breath, fatigue, and palpitations. On auscultation, midsystolic click followed by late systolic murmur can be heard, louder when person is in standing position.
- Aortic aneurysm: Aortic aneurysms, particularly when they rupture or dissect, cause sudden, severe chest or back pain often described as tearing or ripping. Thoracic aortic aneurysms are usually asymptomatic until they expand or rupture at which point they often have a >94% mortality rate.

=== Respiratory ===
- Asthma is a common long-term inflammatory disease of the airways of the lungs. It is characterized by variable and recurring symptoms, reversible airflow obstruction, and Bronchospasm. Symptoms include episodes of wheezing, coughing, chest tightness, and shortness of breath. Chest pain usually happens during a strenuous activity or heavy exercise.
- Bronchitis: Bronchitis occurs due to inflammation of the bronchial tubes, often triggered by viral infections or irritants like smoke, leading to excessive mucus production and airway obstruction. Common symptoms include a productive cough, wheezing, mild chest discomfort, and fatigue.
- Pulmonary embolism: Common signs and symptoms are shortness of breath, pleuritic chest pain, blood in sputum during cough, and lower limb swelling. Risk factors includes: recent surgery, cancer, and bedridden state. Embolus source usually comes from venous thromboembolism.
- Pneumonia: Pneumonia arises from infections that cause inflammation and fluid accumulation in the alveoli of the lungs, with bacterial pathogens like Streptococcus pneumoniae being common culprits. Clinically, it manifests as fever, persistent cough, difficulty breathing, and pleuritic chest pain that worsens with deep breaths.
- Hemothorax: A hemothorax occurs from accumulation of blood in the pleural cavity, commonly due to trauma, vascular injury, or coagulopathies, which can disrupt lung expansion and oxygenation. Key symptoms include sharp chest pain, difficulty breathing, low blood pressure in severe cases, and diminished breath sounds accompanied by dullness to percussion over the affected area.
- Pneumothorax: Those who are at a higher risk of developing pneumothorax are tall, slim male smokers who have had underlying lung diseases such as emphysema. Those affected can have a sharp chest pain which radiates to the shoulder of the same side. Physical examination revealed absent breath sounds and hyperresonance on the affected side of the chest.
- Pleurisy: (Pleuritic Chest Pain) The pain is sharp, localized, and is frequently exacerbated with coughing or inspiration. It can be attributed to various etiologies including pulmonary embolism, pneumothorax, pericarditis, and viral pleurisy.
- Tuberculosis: Tuberculosis is caused by Mycobacterium tuberculosis, which primarily infects the lungs, leading to Granuloma formation as the immune system walls off the bacteria. Symptoms include chronic cough, fever, night sweats, weight loss, and pleuritic chest pain if the pleura is involved, often worsening with deep breaths or coughing.
- Tracheitis: Tracheitis, usually a bacterial driven inflammation of the trachea, which often narrows the airway. It can present as stridor and may cause respiratory distress symptoms like tachypnea, cyanosis, and hoarseness. Clinical symptoms include a dry, painful cough that worsens at night and may progress to a productive cough, fever, and retrosternal chest pain due to irritation of tracheal mucosa.
- Lung cancer: Hemoptysis, cough, dyspnea, chest pain, and other constitutional symptoms are commonly seen in lung cancer

=== Gastrointestinal ===
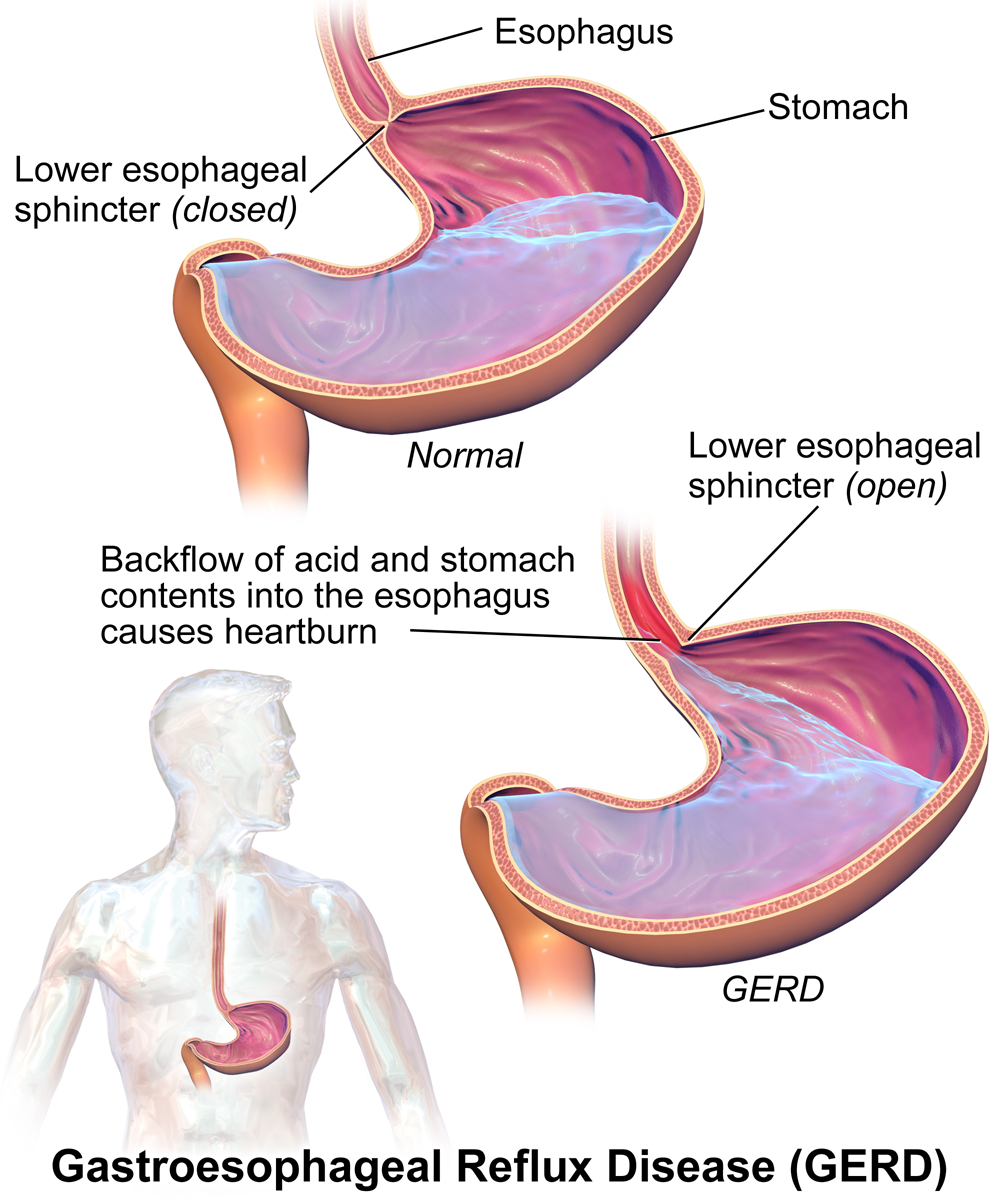
Gastroesophageal reflux disease is a common cause of chest pain in adults

- Gastroesophageal reflux disease: The pain is aggravated when lying down or after meals. Affected individuals may describe this as a heartburn. Besides, they may also complain of tasting bitter contents from the stomach.
- Achalasia, nutcracker esophagus, and other motility disorders of the esophagus
- Diffuse esophageal spasm: Unlike cardiac chest pain, esophageal pain is not related to activity. The pain is usually associated with swallowing of hot or cold water.
- Esophageal rupture: Those affected usually complain of sudden, severe, and constant pain that starts from the neck to the upper abdomen. The pain is aggravated by swallowing. On examination, neck swelling and Crepitus can be felt due to subcutaneous emphysema as free air is entering from esophagus into the subcutaneous tissue.
- Esophagitis: There are many causes of esophagitis. Esophagitis caused by Candida albicans is usually found in people on chemotherapy or with HIV. Medication such as nonsteroidal anti-inflammatory drug and alendronate can induce esophagitis if not swallowed properly.
- Functional dyspepsia: Functional dyspepsia is characterized by upper abdominal discomfort without an identifiable organic cause. Symptoms include epigastric pain or burning, postprandial fullness, early satiety, bloating, nausea, and belching; notably, chest pain can also manifest, potentially mimicking cardiac conditions
- Hiatus hernia: A hiatal hernia occurs when a portion of the stomach pushes upward through the diaphragm into the chest cavity. While gastroesophageal reflux, presenting as heartburn and regurgitation, is the hallmark symptom, other manifestations such as dysphagia, epigastric or chest pain, and chronic iron deficiency anemia may also occur.
- Jackhammer esophagus (hypercontractile peristalsis): Intense long-lasting esophageal muscle spasm.
- Acute cholecystitis: Characterized by positive Murphy's sign where the person has a cessation of inhalation when the doctor places his finger at the right subcostal region of the abdomen.
- Acute pancreatitis: History of excessive alcohol use, cholelithiasis (stones in the gallbladder), and hypertriglyceridemia are risk factors for pancreatitis. The pain is described as sharp, burning, and can worsen after eating.
- Perforated peptic ulcer: Sudden onset of severe pain in the upper abdomen which later develops into peritonitis (inflammation of tissues that lines the abdominal organs).
- Acute gastritis: Common presentations include upper gastrointestinal issues such as epigastric pain, heartburn, bloating, and a feeling of early fullness

=== Chest wall ===
- Costochondritis or Tietze's syndrome: An inflammation of a costochondral junction. Any movements or palpation of the chest can reproduce the symptoms.
- Spinal nerve problem
- Fibromyalgia: Fibromyalgia is a chronic condition presenting with but not limited to widespread musculoskeletal pain, often accompanied by fatigue, sleep disturbances, and cognitive difficulties. Symptoms can vary widely; common reports include chest pain, muscle weakness, abdominal cramps, dizziness, insomnia, and numbness or tingling
- Chest wall problems: Chest pain can arise from musculoskeletal issues i.e. scleroderma, costochondritis, cervical radiculitis, among others.
- Radiculopathy (Cervical Angina) Cervical spondylosis presents as sharp pain traveling from the neck to the chest and can be reproduced by turning of the neck sideways. Spurling's test can help rule out this etiology.
- Precordial catch syndrome: Another benign and harmless form of a sharp, localized chest pain often mistaken for heart disease.
- Breast conditions
- Herpes zoster (shingles): It is usually described as a burning sensation over the chest in a unilateral dermatome distribution. However, diagnosis can be difficult because the pain usually appears before the characteristic rash is visible.
- Osteoarthritis: Osteoarthritis of the manubriosternal joint is a very uncommon presentation of chest pain
- Bornholm disease: Bornholm disease is a viral illness marked by a brief febrile episode accompanied by sharp pains in the lower chest or upper abdomen. The condition may also involve muscle tenderness and localized swelling, with chest pain being a prominent symptom.
- Rib fracture: Rib fractures often cause pain that intensifies with deep breathing, leading people to breathe shallowly to minimize discomfort, especially after trauma. In individuals with a history of cancer, rib metastases should be considered if symptoms like tenderness, weight loss, fatigue, and reduced appetite are present.

=== Psychological ===
- Panic attack: Chest pain is a common symptom of panic attacks, with as high as 78% of persons describing chest pain with their worst panic attacks. Overall chest pain is a symptom of up to 48% of sudden-onset panic attacks, and 10% of gradual-onset panic attacks.
- Anxiety: Generalized anxiety disorder (GAD) is characterized by persistent and excessive worry, often accompanied by physical symptoms such as chest pain, restlessness, fatigue, and muscle tension
- Clinical depression: Depression, linked to chest pain through its physical and emotional effects, has been shown in studies to independently increase the long-term risk of coronary heart disease (CHD) and myocardial infarction (MI), potentially contributing to cardiovascular disease.
- Somatization disorder: Somatization disorder can present with chronic physical symptoms without an identifiable medical cause; it often manifests as chest pain and results from underlying psychological distress
- Hypochondria

=== Others ===
- Hyperventilation syndrome often presents with chest pain and a tingling sensation of the fingertips and around the mouth.
- Tuberculosis: Chest pain associated with tuberculosis often arises from tuberculous pericarditis, a condition caused by Mycobacterium tuberculosis affecting the pericardium. This inflammation typically results in symptoms such as chest discomfort, coughing, fever, night sweats, and unintentional weight loss
- Da Costa's syndrome
- Carbon monoxide poisoning: Chest pain, along with symptoms like headache, dizziness, nausea, and confusion, can occur as a result of carbon monoxide poisoning, which is often mistaken for the flu due to its nonspecific presentation
- Sarcoidosis: Cardiac sarcoidosis involves the formation of granulomas (clusters of inflammatory cells) within the heart tissue, which can lead to chest pain due to inflammation and fibrosis
- Lead poisoning: Chest pain associated with lead poisoning may result from its impact on the cardiovascular system, including hypertension or vascular damage, often occurring in conjunction with fatigue and abdominal pain
- Prolapsed intervertebral disc
- Thoracic outlet syndrome: Occurs when nerves or blood vessels are compressed in the space between the first rib and the collarbone, causing symptoms such as pain in the neck, shoulder, or chest, along with arm weakness or numbness
- Adverse effect from certain medications

== Pathophysiology ==
The chemical pathways involved in causing chest pain vary depending on the etiology.

=== Angina pectoris ===
In angina pectoris (cardiac chest pain), loss of blood flow to the heart causes the release of chemical mediators such as serotonin, histamine, thromboxane A2, bradykinin, reactive oxygen species, lactic acid, and especially adenosine that trigger cyclooxygenase enzymes to produce prostaglandins. These prostaglandins and chemical mediators interact with nerves innervating the heart, leading to the sensation of chest pain. In addition, atherosclerotic plaques occluding the coronary arteries may break apart, thus inflaming the arterial walls and causing the release of other chemical mediators such as prostaglandins, leukotrienes and substance P that sensitize pain receptors and amplifies the magnitude of the chest pain.

The activation of pain receptors innervating the heart also stimulates other converging nerves in the spinal cord. These signals may be misinterpreted by the brain as pain originating from the neck, jaw, and left shoulder and hand, hence why there is often referred pain to these areas during anginal episodes.

=== Chest pain due to gastrointestinal issues ===
Due to the proximity of the esophagus to the heart, many esophageal disorders cause chest pain and can even affect blood flow to and electrical activity within the heart. Gastroesophageal reflux disease (GERD) is an especially common mimic of chest pain. In GERD, the presence of esophageal acid alters sensory perception and the processing of pain signals from the heart.

Gallbladder disease is also notorious in causing referred chest pain, as well as pain in the abdomen and back. Studies have confirmed that there is convergence between the neurons detecting pain in the gallbladder and in the heart. This overlap explains how stretching of the gallbladder wall can cause chest pain as well.

=== Psychosomatic chest pain ===
Many individuals undergoing stress or who have psychiatric disorders such as depression and anxiety can experience angina-like chest pain despite not having any heart disease. Studies have implicated an increase in glucocorticoid levels within the central nucleus of the amygdala in causing chest pain as a result of stress.

== Diagnostic approach ==
=== History taking ===
Knowing a person's risk factors can be extremely useful in ruling in or ruling out serious causes of chest pain. For example, heart attack and thoracic aortic dissection are very rare in healthy individuals under 30 years of age but significantly more common in individuals with significant risk factors, such as older age, smoking, hypertension, diabetes, history of coronary artery disease or stroke, positive family history (premature atherosclerosis, cholesterol disorders, heart attack at early age), and other risk factors. Chest pain that radiates to one or both shoulders or arms, chest pain that occurs with physical activity, chest pain associated with nausea or vomiting, chest pain accompanied by diaphoresis or sweating, or chest pain described as "pressure," has a higher likelihood of being related to acute coronary syndrome, or inadequate supply of blood to the heart muscle, but even without these symptoms chest pain may be a sign of acute coronary syndrome. Other clues in the history can help lower the suspicion for myocardial infarction. These include chest pain described as "sharp" or "stabbing", chest pain that is positional or pleuritic in nature, and chest pain that can be reproduced with palpation. However, both atypical and typical symptoms of acute coronary syndrome can occur, and in general a history cannot be enough to rule out the diagnosis of acute coronary syndrome. In some cases, chest pain may not even be a symptom of an acute cardiac event. An estimated 33% of persons with myocardial infarction in the United States do not present with chest pain, and carry a significantly higher mortality as a result of delayed treatment.

=== Physical examination ===
Careful medical history and physical examination is essential in separating dangerous from trivial causes of disease, and the management of chest pain may be done on specialized units (termed medical assessment units) to concentrate the investigations. Occasionally, invisible medical signs will direct the diagnosis towards particular causes, such as Levine's sign in cardiac ischemia. However, in the case of acute coronary syndrome, a third heart sound, diaphoresis, and hypotension are the most strongly associated physical exam findings. However these signs are limited in their prognostic and diagnostic value. Other physical exam findings suggestive of cardiac chest pain may include hypertension, tachycardia, bradycardia, and new heart murmurs. Chest pain that is reproducible during the physical exam with contact of the chest wall is more indicative of non-cardiac chest pain, but still cannot completely rule out acute coronary syndrome. For this reason, in general, additional tests are required to establish the diagnosis.

In the emergency department the typical approach to chest pain involves ruling out the most dangerous causes: heart attack, pulmonary embolism, thoracic aortic dissection, esophageal rupture, tension pneumothorax, and cardiac tamponade. By elimination or confirmation of the most serious causes, a diagnosis of the origin of the pain may be made. Often, no definite cause will be found and reassurance is then provided.

=== Risk scores ===
Depending on healthcare provider preference, there is a variety of algorithms that can be used to classify a patient with chest pain as low-, medium-, or high-risk for an adverse cardiac event.

==== HEART score ====
The HEART (History, ECG, Age, Risk factors, Troponin) score stratifies individuals with chest pain into low-risk and high-risk groups. Based on the cumulative score and associated risk of an adverse cardiac event (such as a heart attack), it recommends either discharge or admission:

HEART score
Criteria	Point Value
History
Highly suspicious	+2
Moderately suspicious	+1
Slightly suspicious	0
ECG
Significant ST-depression	+2
Nonspecific repolarization disturbance	+1
Normal	0
Age
≥ 65	+2
45–65	+1
≤ 45	0
Risk factors*
≥ 3 risk factors or history of atherosclerotic disease	+2
1-2 risk factors	+1
No risk factors known	0
Troponin
≥ 3× normal limit	+2
1–3× normal limit	+1
≤ normal limit	0
*include hypercholesterolemia, hypertension, diabetes mellitus, smoking, obesity

Cumulative score:

- 0-3: 2.5% risk of adverse cardiac event. Patient's can be discharged with follow-up.
- 4-6: 20.3% risk of adverse cardiac event. Patients should be admitted to the hospital for trending of troponin and provocative testing.
- ≥7: 72.7% risk of adverse cardiac event, suggesting early invasive measures with these patients and close coordination with inpatient cardiology.

If acute coronary syndrome ("heart attack") is suspected, many people are admitted briefly for observation, sequential ECGs, and measurement of cardiac enzymes in the blood over time. On occasion, further tests on follow up may determine the cause.

==== Thrombolysis in Myocardial Infarction (TIMI) and Accelerated Diagnostic Protocol for Chest Pain Trial (ADAPT) scores ====
As one of the earliest risk stratification scores developed for chest pain, the TIMI score estimates the chance of a major adverse cardiac event (MACE) such as a heart attack in the next 14 days. It assigns 1 point for each of the listed parameters. Patients with a score of 0 or 1 are at a lower risk for a MACE.

Parameter
Age ≥ 65
≥ 3 coronary artery disease (CAD) risk factors*
Known CAD with stenosis ≥ 50%
Aspirin use in the past 7 days
ECG ST changes ≥ 0.5 mm
Positive cardiac marker
*hypertension, diabetes, dyslipidemia,

family history of heart disease, or current smoker

The original TIMI score developed in 2000 was intended for application in patients with a non-ST-elevation myocardial infarction (NSTEMI) or unstable angina. However, when paired with cardiac lab tests such as troponin, CKMB, and/or myoglobin (ADAPT score), it can be useful in evaluating the risk of MACE in patients with chest pain of unclear etiology as well.

==== Vancouver Chest Pain Rule (VPCR) ====
The VPCR focuses on risk stratifying patients with undifferentiated chest pain. An individual is considered low-risk and can be discharged to outpatient follow-up if the answer to all of the criteria are "No." The VPCR criteria have since been revised and is as follows:

1. Abnormal initial ECG, positive troponin at 2 hrs, OR prior ACS or nitrate use
2. Pain is reproducible with palpation
3. Age ≥ 50 OR Pain radiates to neck, jaw, or left arm

==== Emergency Department Assessment of Cardiac Pain Score (EDACS) ====
The EDACS is a score developed by researchers from Australia and New Zealand in 2014 that has been gaining prominence in the medical community. It is intended to identify individuals presenting with chest pain who are low-risk for a cardiac event (such as a heart attack) so that they can be discharged for outpatient care. However, unlike the HEART score, it is not intended for patients in whom a cardiac cause of chest pain is suspected or for patients who have unstable vital signs.

EDACS
Criteria	Point Value
Age
18–45	+2
46–50	+4
51–55	+6
56–60	+8
61–65	+10
66–70	+12
71–75	+14
76–80	+16
81–85	+18
86+	+20
Sex
Male sex	+6
Male individual of age 18–50 with known coronary artery disease or 3+ risk factors*	+4
Signs and symptoms
Diaphoresis	+3
Radiation of pain to arm or shoulder	+5
Pain occurs with or worsens upon inspiration	-4
Pain is reproducible by palpation	-6
*including dyslipidemia, diabetes, hypertension, current smoker, or family history of premature coronary artery disease

Low-risk patients who can safely go home and seek early outpatient follow-up for their chest pain should meet the following criteria:

- Total cumulative EDACS score < 16
- No new ischemia on EKG
- 0- and 2-hr troponin levels are both negative

Patients who do not meet this low-risk criteria should undergo further observation and usual chest pain workup.

Studies have shown that EDACS can correctly classify up to 50% of all patients presenting with chest pain as safe for early discharge, making it more accurate than other scales such as ADAPT, HEART, and the Vancouver Chest Pain Rule in identifying low-risk patients.

=== Medical tests ===
Depending on the differential diagnoses made based on history and physical examination, a number of tests may be ordered:

Blood tests:

- Complete blood count (CBC)
- Cardiac enzymes: troponin, creatine kinase, and myosin for myocardial infarction
- Electrolytes and renal function (creatinine)
- Liver enzymes
- D-dimer: when suspicion for pulmonary embolism is present but low
- Serum Lipase: to exclude acute pancreatitis

Other tests:

- Electrocardiogram (ECG)
- Chest radiograph (CXR)
- Echocardiograph: useful in patients with known cardiac disease or aortic dissection
- CT scan: useful in diagnosis of aortic dissection
- V/Q scintigraphy or CT pulmonary angiogram: useful when pulmonary embolism is suspected

== Management ==
Management of chest pain varies with the underlying cause of the pain and the stage of care.

=== Prehospital care ===
If an individual develops chest pain and suspects that they are suffering a myocardial infarction, they can calm down, remain in a position that is comfortable, and call emergency medical services while trying any other action of the applicable first aid process.

Chest pain is a common symptom encountered by emergency medical services. Aspirin increases survival in people with acute coronary syndrome and it is reasonable for EMS dispatchers to recommend it in people with no recent serious bleeding. Supplemental oxygen was used in the past for most people with chest pain but is not needed unless the oxygen saturations are less than 94% or there are signs of respiratory distress. Entonox is frequently used by EMS personnel in the prehospital environment. However, there is little evidence about its effectiveness.

=== Hospital care ===
Hospital care of chest pain begins with initial survey of a person's vital signs, airway and breathing, and level of consciousness. This may also include attachment of ECG leads, cardiac monitors, intravenous lines and other medical devices depending on initial evaluation. After evaluation of a person's history, risk factors, physical examination, laboratory testing and imaging, management begins depending on suspected diagnoses. Depending upon the diagnosis, a person may be placed in the intensive care unit, admitted to the hospital, or be treated outpatient. For persons with suspected cardiac chest pain or acute coronary syndrome, or other emergent diagnoses such as pneumothorax, pulmonary embolism, or aortic dissection, admission to the hospital is most often recommended for further treatment.

=== Outpatient care ===
Patients with low-risk cardiac chest pain may undergo a cardiac stress test, usually involving treadmill or chemical stimulation to strain the heart and reproduce the chest pain. The activity of the heart is often monitored during these exams using electrocardiography, echocardiography, or cardiac MRI. Computed tomography angiography (CTA) is another option but is not often recommended due to financial burden, radiation exposure, and variable access.

For people with non-cardiac chest pain, cognitive behavioral therapy might be helpful on an outpatient basis. A 2015 Cochrane review found that cognitive behavioral therapy might reduce the frequency of chest pain episodes the first three months after treatment.

For persons with chest pain due to gastroesophageal reflux disease, a proton-pump inhibitor has been shown to be the most effective treatment. However, treatment with proton pump inhibitors has been shown to be no better than placebo in persons with noncardiac chest pain not caused by gastroesophageal reflux disease.

For musculoskeletal causes of chest pain, manipulation therapy or chiropractic therapy, acupuncture, or a recommendation for increased exercise are often used as treatment. Studies have shown conflicting results on the efficacy of these treatments. A combination therapy of nonsteroidal anti-inflammatory drugs and manipulation therapy with at-home exercises has been shown to be most effective in treatment of musculoskeletal chest pain.

== Epidemiology ==
Chest pain is a common presenting problem. Overall chest pain is responsible for an estimated 6% of all emergency department visits in the United States and is the most common reason for hospital admission. Chest pain is also very common in primary care clinics, representing 1–3% of all visits. The rate of emergency department visits in the US for chest pain decreased 10% from 1999 to 2008. but a subsequent increase of 13% was seen from 2006 to 2011. Less than 20% of all cases of chest pain admissions are found to be due to coronary artery disease. The rate of chest pain as a symptom of acute coronary syndrome varies among populations based upon age, sex, and previous medical conditions. In general, women are more likely than men to present without chest pain (49% vs. 38%) in cases of myocardial infarction.

== See also ==
- Abdominal pain
- Atorvastatin and tadalafil
