= Troponin =

Protein complex

Cardiac troponin I/T in serum
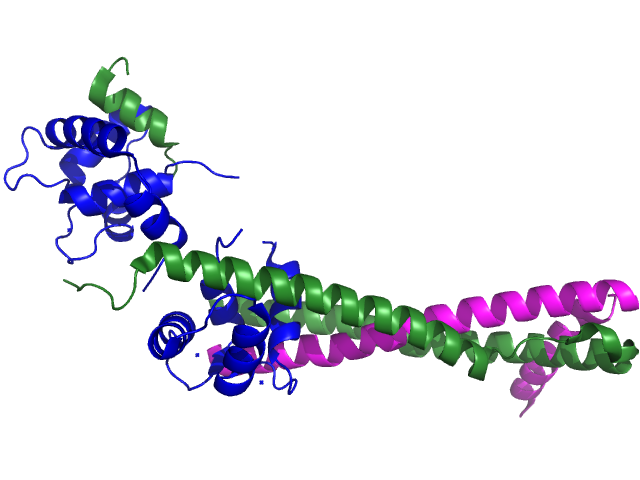
- Ribbon representation of the human cardiac troponin core complex (52 kDa core) in the calcium-saturated form. Blue = troponin C; green = troponin I; magenta = troponin T.
- Synonyms: "troponin" (vague)
- Purpose: Detect heart damage

Troponin, or the troponin complex, is a complex of three subunits of specialized regulatory proteins –troponin C, troponin I, and troponin T, that are components of the contraction mechanism in striated muscle.

Measurements of cardiac-specific troponins I and T are extensively used as diagnostic and prognostic indicators in the management of myocarditis, myocardial infarction and acute coronary syndrome. Blood levels of cardiac troponin (cTn) may be used as a diagnostic marker for stroke or other myocardial injury that is ongoing, although the sensitivity of this measurement is low.

== Function ==
Troponin is attached to the protein tropomyosin and lies within the groove between actin filaments in muscle tissue. In a relaxed muscle, tropomyosin blocks the attachment site for the myosin crossbridge, thus preventing contraction. When the muscle cell is stimulated to contract by an action potential, calcium channels open in the sarcoplasmic membrane and release calcium into the sarcoplasm. Some of this calcium attaches to troponin, which causes it to change shape, exposing binding sites for myosin (active sites) on the actin filaments. Myosin's binding to actin causes crossbridge formation, and contraction of the muscle begins.

Smooth muscle does not have troponin.

Troponin activation. Troponin C (red) binds Ca2+, which stabilizes the activated state, where troponin I (yellow) is no longer bound to actin. Troponin T (blue) anchors the complex on tropomyosin.

== Physiology ==
In both cardiac and skeletal muscles, muscular force production is controlled primarily by changes in intracellular calcium concentration. In general, when calcium rises, the muscles contract and, when calcium falls, the muscles relax.

Troponin is a component of thin filaments (along with actin and tropomyosin), and is the protein complex to which calcium binds to trigger the production of muscular force. Troponin has three subunits, TnC, TnI, and TnT, each playing a role in force regulation.. Under resting intracellular levels of calcium, tropomyosin covers the active actin sites to which myosin (a molecular motor organized in muscle thick filaments) binds in order to generate force. When calcium becomes bound to specific sites in the N-domain of TnC, a series of protein structural changes occurs, such that tropomyosin is rolled away from myosin-binding sites on actin, allowing myosin to attach to the thin filament and produce force and shorten the sarcomere.

Individual subunits serve different functions:

- Troponin C binds to calcium ions (Ca^{2+}) to produce a conformational change in TnI
- Troponin T binds to tropomyosin, interlocking them to form a troponin-tropomyosin complex with thin filaments
- Troponin I binds to actin in thin myofilaments to hold the actin-tropomyosin complex in place. It inhibits the ATPase activise of actomyosin.

Inside the cardiac troponin complex, the strongest interaction between molecules is the cTnI–TnC binary complex, especially in the presence of Ca^{2+} (K_{A} = 1.5 × 10^{−8} M^{−1}). TnC, forming a complex with cTnI, changes the conformation of cTnI molecule and shields part of its surface. According to the latest data cTnI is released in the blood stream of the patient in the form of binary complex with TnC or ternary complex with cTnT and TnC. cTnI-TnC complex formation plays an important positive role in improving the stability of cTnI molecule. cTnI, which is extremely unstable in its free form, demonstrates significantly better stability in complex with TnC or in ternary cTnI-cTnT-TnC complex. It has been demonstrated that stability of cTnI in native complex is significantly better than stability of the purified form of the protein or the stability of cTnI in artificial troponin complexes combined from purified proteins.

=== Paralogs ===
Troponin is found in both skeletal muscle and cardiac muscle, but the specific versions of troponin differ between types of muscle. Different combinations of paralogous genes (vaguely called "isoforms", not to be confused with gene isoforms) are used to make the version of troponin seen in each type of muscle.

- Cardiac troponin C (cTnC) TNNC1 is expressed in cardiac and slow skeletal muscle, while skeletal troponin C (sTnC) TNNC2 is expressed in fast skeletal muscle. sTnC has four calcium ion-binding sites, whereas in cTnC there are only three. The actual amount of calcium that binds to troponin has not been definitively established. Because slow skeletal muscle and myocardium share a type, TnC is not used in diagnostics.
- Mammals have three troponin I (TnI) genes: the cardiac (TNNI3, cTnI), the slow skeletal (TNNI1), and the fast skeletal (TNNI2). Because the heart uses its own version, blood levels of cTnI is used as a clinical marker.
- Mammals have three troponin T (TnT) genes: the cardiac (TNNT2, cTnT), the slow skeletal (TNNT1), and the fast skeletal (TNNT3). Again, because the heart uses its own version, cTnT is used as a clinical marker.

In addition to the myocardium, there are reports of CTnI and CTnT expression in the wall muscle coat of the vena cava and pulmonary veins, so they do not purely originate from the heart. The expression of cTnT in skeletal tissue of patients with chronic skeletal muscle injuries has been described.

==== Use in diagnostics ====
First cTnI and later cTnT were originally used as markers for cardiac cell death. Both proteins are now widely used to diagnose acute myocardial infarction (AMI), unstable angina, post-surgery myocardium trauma and some other related diseases with cardiac muscle injury. Both markers can be detected in patient's blood 3–6 hours after onset of the chest pain, reaching peak level within 16–30 hours. Elevated concentration of cTnI and cTnT in blood samples can be detected even 5–8 days after onset of the symptoms, making both proteins useful also for the late diagnosis of AMI.

== Detection ==
Cardiac troponin T and I are measured by immunoassay methods.

- Due to patent regulations, a single manufacturer (Roche Diagnostics) distributes cTnT.
- A host of diagnostic companies make cTnI immunoassay methods available on many different immunoassay platforms.

Cardiac troponin elevation following cardiac cell necrosis starts within 2–3 hours, peaks in approx. 24 hours, and persists for 1–2 weeks.

Lateral-flow tests ("rapid diagnostic kits") have been developed for cardiac troponin I. The more basic kinds are qualitative and detect cTnI > 0.5 ng/L. More advanced types allow a quantitative readout using colorimetry, electrochemical fluorescence, or a magnetic detector.

== cTnI/T as biomarkers ==
=== Cardiac conditions ===
Subtypes of troponin (cardiac I and T) are sensitive and specific indicators of heart muscle damage (myocardium). They are measured in the blood to differentiate between unstable angina and myocardial infarction (heart attack) in people with chest pain or acute coronary syndrome. A person who recently had a myocardial infarction has areas of damaged heart muscle and elevated cardiac troponin levels in the blood. This can also occur in people with coronary vasospasm, a type of myocardial infarction involving severe constriction of the cardiac blood vessels. After a myocardial infarction troponins may remain high for up to 2 weeks.

Cardiac troponins are a marker of all heart muscle damage, not just myocardial infarction, which is the most severe form of heart disorder. However, diagnostic criteria for raised troponin indicating myocardial infarction is currently set by the WHO at a threshold of 2 μg/L or higher. Critical levels of other cardiac biomarkers are also relevant, such as creatine kinase. Severe tachycardia (for example due to supraventricular tachycardia) in an individual with normal coronary arteries can also lead to increased troponins for example, it is presumed due to increased oxygen demand and inadequate supply to the heart muscle.

Coronary artery stent placement can also cause immediate post-procedure elevated serum cardiac troponin levels. This can be problematic in a clinical setting as troponin values and guidance protocols become subject to more thoughtful interpretation. Essentially, making it difficult for a clinician to use troponin elevation diagnostically in this patient group. After stenting and related PCI procedures, troponin levels do return to standard levels once the stent has 'settled' and is no longer causing localized cardiac muscle inflammation.

In patients with non-severe asymptomatic aortic valve stenosis and no overt coronary artery disease, the increased troponin T (above 14 pg/mL) was found associated with an increased 5-year event rate of ischemic cardiac events (myocardial infarction, percutaneous coronary intervention, or coronary artery bypass surgery).

Troponins are also increased in patients with heart failure, where they also predict mortality and ventricular rhythm abnormalities. They can rise in inflammatory conditions such as myocarditis and pericarditis with heart muscle involvement (which is then termed myopericarditis). Troponins can also indicate several forms of cardiomyopathy, such as dilated cardiomyopathy, hypertrophic cardiomyopathy or (left) ventricular hypertrophy, peripartum cardiomyopathy, Takotsubo cardiomyopathy, or infiltrative disorders such as cardiac amyloidosis.

Heart injury with increased troponins also occurs in cardiac contusion, defibrillation and internal or external cardioversion. Troponins are commonly increased in several procedures such as cardiac surgery and heart transplantation, closure of atrial septal defects, percutaneous coronary intervention, or radiofrequency ablation.

=== Non-cardiac conditions ===
The distinction between cardiac and non-cardiac conditions is somewhat artificial; the conditions listed below are not primary heart diseases, but they exert indirect effects on the heart muscle. Other conditions that directly or indirectly lead to heart muscle damage and death can also increase troponin levels, such as kidney failure.

Cardiac troponins are increased in around 40% of patients with critical illnesses such as sepsis. There is an increased risk of mortality and length of stay in the intensive-care unit in these patients. In severe gastrointestinal bleeding, there can also be a mismatch between oxygen demand and supply of the myocardium.

==== Hypertension ====
In hypertensive disorders of pregnancy such as preeclampsia, elevated troponin levels indicate some degree of myofibrillary damage.

==== Toxicity ====
Cardiac troponin T and I can be used to monitor drug and toxin-induced cardiomyocyte toxicity. .

Chemotherapy agents can exert toxic effects on the heart (examples include anthracycline, cyclophosphamide, 5-fluorouracil, and cisplatin). Several toxins and venoms can also lead to heart muscle injury (scorpion venom, snake venom, and venom from jellyfish and centipedes). Carbon monoxide poisoning or cyanide poisoning can also be accompanied by the release of troponins due to hypoxic cardiotoxic effects. Cardiac injury occurs in about one-third of severe CO poisoning cases, and troponin screening is appropriate in these patients.

==== Lung ====
In both primary pulmonary hypertension, pulmonary embolism, and acute exacerbations of chronic obstructive pulmonary disease (COPD), right ventricular strain results in increased wall tension and may cause ischemia. Of course, patients with COPD exacerbations might also have concurrent myocardial infarction or pulmonary embolism, so care has to be taken to attribute increased troponin levels to COPD.

==== Kidney ====
People with end-stage kidney disease can have chronically elevated cardiac troponin T levels, which are linked to a poorer prognosis. Troponin I is less likely to be falsely elevated.

==== Skeletal muscle ====
Strenuous endurance exercise such as marathons or triathlons can lead to increased cardiac troponin levels in up to one-third of subjects, but it is not linked to adverse health effects in these competitors.

High cardiac troponin T levels have also been reported in patients with inflammatory muscle diseases such as polymyositis or dermatomyositis. Troponins are also increased in rhabdomyolysis.

==== COVID-19 ====
In 2020, it was found that patients with severe COVID-19 had higher cardiac troponin I levels compared to those with milder disease.

=== Prognostic use ===
Elevated cardiac troponin levels are prognostically important in many of the conditions in which they are used for diagnosis.

In a community-based cohort study indicating the importance of silent cardiac damage, cardiac troponin I has been shown to predict mortality and first coronary heart disease event in men free from cardiovascular disease at baseline. In people with stroke, elevated blood troponin levels are not a useful marker to detect the condition.

== Evolution ==
There are five groups of TNNI in vertebrates, the extra two known as TNNI4 and TNNI5 (only found in non-amniotes). They are more similar to TNNI1 than to TNNI2 and TNNI3. Likewise, there are four groups of TNNT in vertebrates, with TNNT4 (only found in cartilaginous fishes, ray-finned fishes and lungfish) most closely resembling TNNT2. In most vertebrates and some non-vertebrate chordates, TNNI and TNNT genes tend to occur in pairs next to each other. It is likely that an ancestor to vertebrates had one such pair, which was duplicated into four during the two rounds of whole-genome duplication in early vertebrate evolution, with TNNT5 arising as an additional tandem dupliaction of TNNT4.

Most vertebrates express TNNI1 and/or TNNI5 in the heart, whereas adult tetrapods (such as mammals) use TNNI3. Embryonic mammals use TNNI1 in the heart. In humans and teterapods in general, TNNI3 differ from the other TnI genes by having an N-termianl extension; a strikingly similar extension is found in the TNNI5 of cartilaginous, non-teleost ray-finned, and sarcopterygian fishes. Ray finned fishes do not have TNNI3 at all. Substituting TNNI3 for TNNI1 may confer increased tolerance to acidosis.

Considering the similarity between TNNI and TNNT, the gene pair may have been the result of an even more ancient tandem duplication event. If this is the case, such a duplication must have happened early in animal evolution (more than 700 million years ago), as genes that encode for all three subunits of troponin have been found in every invertebrate phyla except the Cnidaria (or equivalently, all Bilaterian phyla). The ancestral gene pair most closely resembled TNNI2-TNNT3.

== See also ==
- Calcium-binding protein
- Troponin C
- Troponin I
- Troponin T
