= Troponin T, fast skeletal muscle =

Protein-coding gene in the species Homo sapiens

TNNT3

Identifiers
- Aliases: TNNT3, TNTF, troponin T3, fast skeletal type, beta-TnTF, DA2B2
- External IDs: OMIM: 600692; MGI: 109550; GeneCards: TNNT3

Gene location (Human)
Chr.	Chromosome 11 (human)
Band	11p15.5	Start	1,919,703 bp
Band	11p15.5	End	1,938,706 bp

Gene location (Mouse)
Chr.	Chromosome 7 (mouse)
Band	7 F5|7 87.94 cM	Start	142,498,836 bp
Band	7 F5|7 87.94 cM	End	142,516,009 bp
RNA expression pattern
Bgee	Human / Mouse (ortholog); Top expressed in: muscle of thigh; skeletal muscle tissue; gastrocnemius muscle; apex of heart; left ventricle; testicle; placenta; right uterine tube; right auricle of heart; subcutaneous adipose tissue / Top expressed in: sternocleidomastoid muscle; temporal muscle; digastric muscle; triceps brachii muscle; extensor digitorum longus muscle; plantaris muscle; tibialis anterior muscle; triceps surae; muscle of thigh; extraocular muscle; More reference expression data
BioGPS	n/a
Gene ontology
Molecular function	calcium-dependent ATPase activity; actin binding; tropomyosin binding; troponin I binding; calcium-dependent protein binding; troponin C binding; calcium ion binding; protein binding
Cellular component	cytosol; troponin complex
Biological process	regulation of muscle contraction; skeletal muscle contraction; regulation of striated muscle contraction; regulation of ATP-dependent activity; muscle filament sliding; muscle contraction; sarcomere organization; cardiac muscle contraction
Sources:Amigo / QuickGO
Orthologs
Databases	NCBI: entry; OMA: entry
Species	Human	Mouse
Entrez	7140	21957
Ensembl	ENSG00000130595; ENSG00000288250	ENSMUSG00000061723
UniProt	P45378	Q9QZ47
RefSeq (mRNA)	NM_001042780; NM_001042781; NM_001042782; NM_001297646; NM_006757 NM_001363561; NM_001367842; NM_001367843; NM_001367844; NM_001367845; NM_001367846; NM_001367847; NM_001367848; NM_001367849; NM_001367850; NM_001367851; NM_001367852	NM_001163664; NM_001163665; NM_001163666; NM_001163667; NM_001163668 NM_001163669; NM_001163670; NM_011620; NM_001347546; NM_001347547; NM_001347548; NM_001347549; NM_001347550; NM_001347551; NM_001347552; NM_001360157; NM_001360158
RefSeq (protein)	NP_001036245; NP_001036246; NP_001036247; NP_001284575; NP_006748 NP_001350490; NP_001354771; NP_001354772; NP_001354773; NP_001354774; NP_001354775; NP_001354776; NP_001354777; NP_001354778; NP_001354779; NP_001354780; NP_001354781	NP_001157136; NP_001157137; NP_001157138; NP_001157139; NP_001157140 NP_001157141; NP_001157142; NP_001334475; NP_001334476; NP_001334477; NP_001334478; NP_001334479; NP_001334480; NP_001334481; NP_035750; NP_001347086; NP_001347087
Location (UCSC)	Chr 11: 1.92 – 1.94 Mb	Chr 7: 142.5 – 142.52 Mb
PubMed search
- Wikidata
View/Edit Human	View/Edit Mouse

Troponin T, fast skeletal muscle (TnTf) is a protein that in humans is encoded by the TNNT3 gene.

TNNT3 is located on chromosome 11 (p15.5), encoding the fast skeletal muscle isoform of troponin T (fsTnT). fsTnT is an ~31-kDa protein consisting of 268 amino acids including the first methionine with an isoelectric point (pI) of 6.21 (embryonic form). fsTnT is the tropomyosin-binding and thin filament anchoring subunit of the troponin complex in the sarcomeres of fast twitch skeletal muscle. TNNT3 is specifically expressed in vertebrate fast twitch skeletal muscles.

== Evolution ==
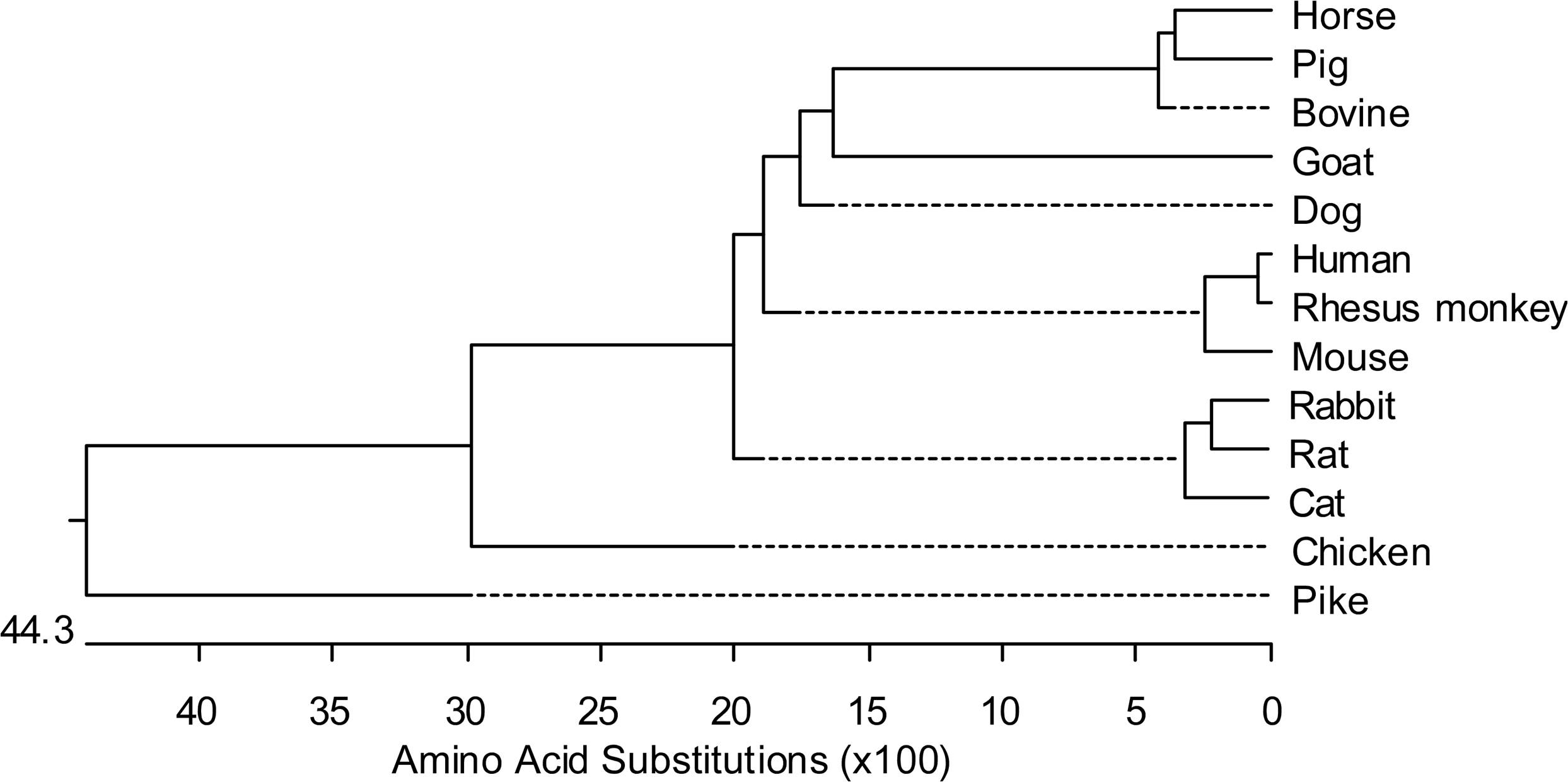

TNNT3 evolved as one of the three TnT isoform genes in vertebrates. Each of the TnT isoform genes is linked to an upstream troponin I (TnI, one of the other two subunits of the troponin complex) isoform gene, and fsTnT is linked with fsTnI genes (Fig. 1). Sequence homology and protein epitope allosteric similarity data suggest that TnT gene was originated by duplication of a TnI-like ancestor gene and fsTnT was the first TnT emerged. Whereas significantly diverged from the slow skeletal muscle TnT (ssTnT encoded by TNNT1) and cardiac TnT (cTnT encoded by TNNT2), Structure of fsTnT is conserved among vertebrate species (Fig. 2), reflecting specialized functional features of the different muscle fiber types.

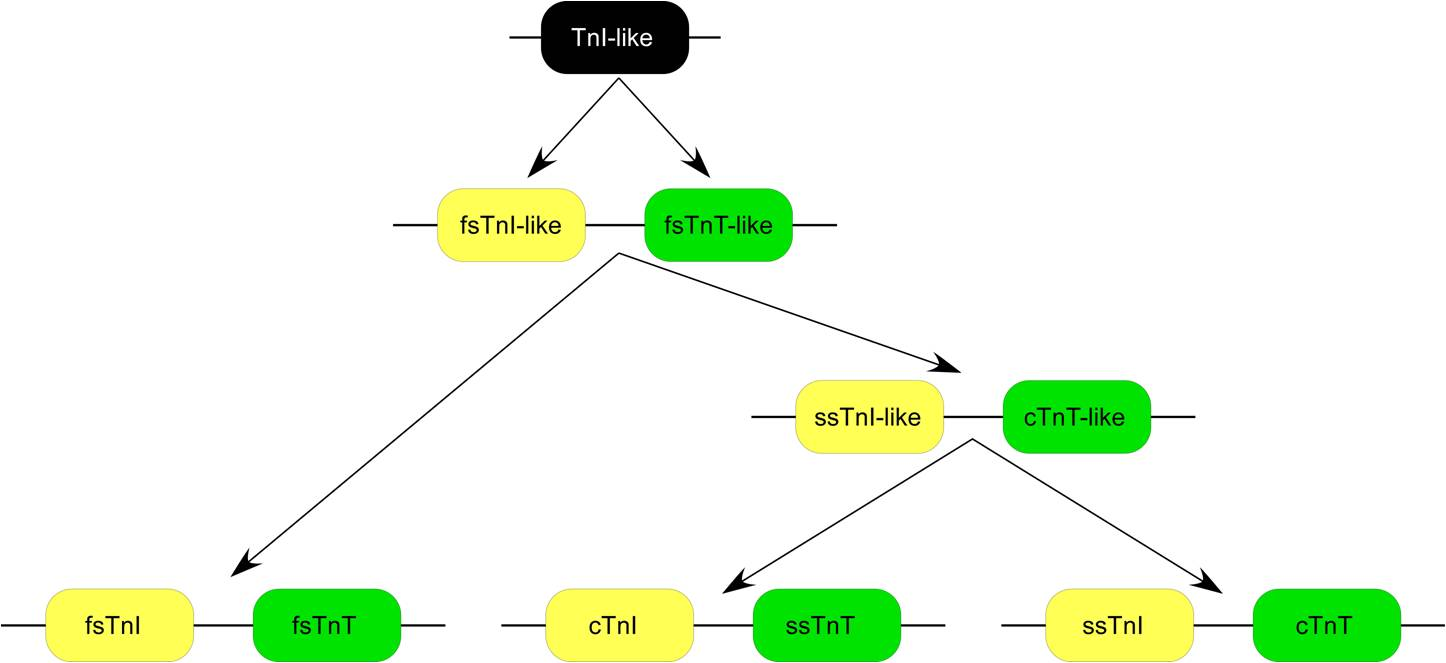

== Alternative splicing ==
In mammals the TNNT3 gene contains 19 exons. Alternative RNA splicing of 8 of them significantly increases structural variations of fsTnT. Two variable regions of the fsTnT protein are generated by alternative splicing (Fig. 3).

In the N-terminal region of fsTnT, exons 4, 5, 6, 7 and 8 are alternatively spliced in adult skeletal muscle cells. A fetal fsTnT exon located between exons 8 and 9 is specifically expressed in embryonic muscle (Briggs and Schachat 1993). Exons 16 and 17, previously designated as α and β exons, in the C-terminal region of fsTnT are alternatively spliced in a mutually exclusive manner.

Avian Tnnt3 gene has evolved with additional alternatively spliced exons, w, P1-7(x) and y, encoding the N-terminal variable region (Fig. 3). Reflecting the power of combined alternative splicing of multiple exons to generate fsTnT variants, two-dimensional gel electrophoresis detected more than 40 different fsTnT splice forms in chicken leg muscle.

== Developmental regulation ==
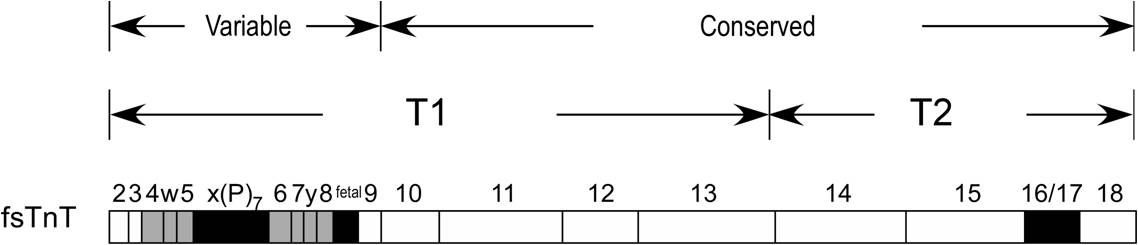

Through alternative splicing of the fetal exon and other alternative exons in the N-terminal variable region, the expression of fsTnT during mammalian and avian development undergoes a high molecular to low molecular weight isoform switch in both fast and slow fiber dominant skeletal muscles. The inclusion of more N-terminal exons increases the negative charge that tunes the overall molecular conformation of fsTnT and alters interaction with TnI, TnC and tropomyosin. The alternative splicing-based addition of N-terminal negative charge in fsTnT also contributes to the tolerance to acidosis.

Alternative splicing of the two C-terminal mutually exclusive exons 16 and 17 appears also regulated during development. Exon 17 with a sequence more similar to the counterpart segment in ssTnT and cTnT is predominantly expressed in embryonic and neonatal fsTnT. Exon 16 of fsTnT was only found in adult skeletal muscles. Exons 16 and 17 both encode a 14 amino acids peptide fragment residing in the α-helix interfacing with TnI and TnC. Protein interaction studies revealed that incorporation of exon 17 weakened binding of fsTnT to TnC and tropomyosin. Therefore, alternative splicing of exons 16 and 17 regulates the binding of fsTnT with TnI, possibly TnC, and thus tunes the function of the troponin complex and skeletal muscle contractility during development.

Avian Tnnt3 gene with additional alternatively spliced exons has unique expression pattern. The seven P exons are specifically expressed in pectoral muscles but not leg muscles. During post hatch development of the avian pectoral muscles, the segment encoded by the P exons (named Tx from the original annotation of the coding exons as an x exon) is up-regulated and included predominantly in fsTnT of adult pectoral muscles. Each P exon encodes a pentapeptide AHH(A/E)A. The Tx segment of adult fsTnT in avian orders of Galliformes and Craciformes contains 7-9 H(A/E)AAH repeats that possess high affinity binding to transition metal ions Cu(II), Ni(II), Zn(II) and Co(II). The Tx segment of chicken breast muscle fsTnT also a binding capacity for calcium, presumably serves as a calcium reservoir in avian fast pectoral muscles. Together with more N-terminal negative charges, this function may contribute to the higher calcium sensitivity of chicken breast muscle than that of leg muscle.

The switch of high to low molecular weight splice forms occurs in avian leg muscles during post hatching development similar to that in developing mammalian skeletal muscles. Early during post hatch development of chicken pectoral muscles, fsTnT also shows a high to low molecular weight switch. However, around 28 days after hatch, fsTnT with Tx segment spliced-in is rapidly up-regulated and becomes the major fsTnT splice form in adult pectoral muscles.

Deficiency of ssTnT did not affect the developmental switch of fsTnT splice forms in ssTnT-null mice, indicating that the developmental alternative splicing of the fsTnT pre-mRNA is regulated independent of skeletal muscle fiber type abnormality and adaptation.
