= Troponin T =

Protein family

Troponin

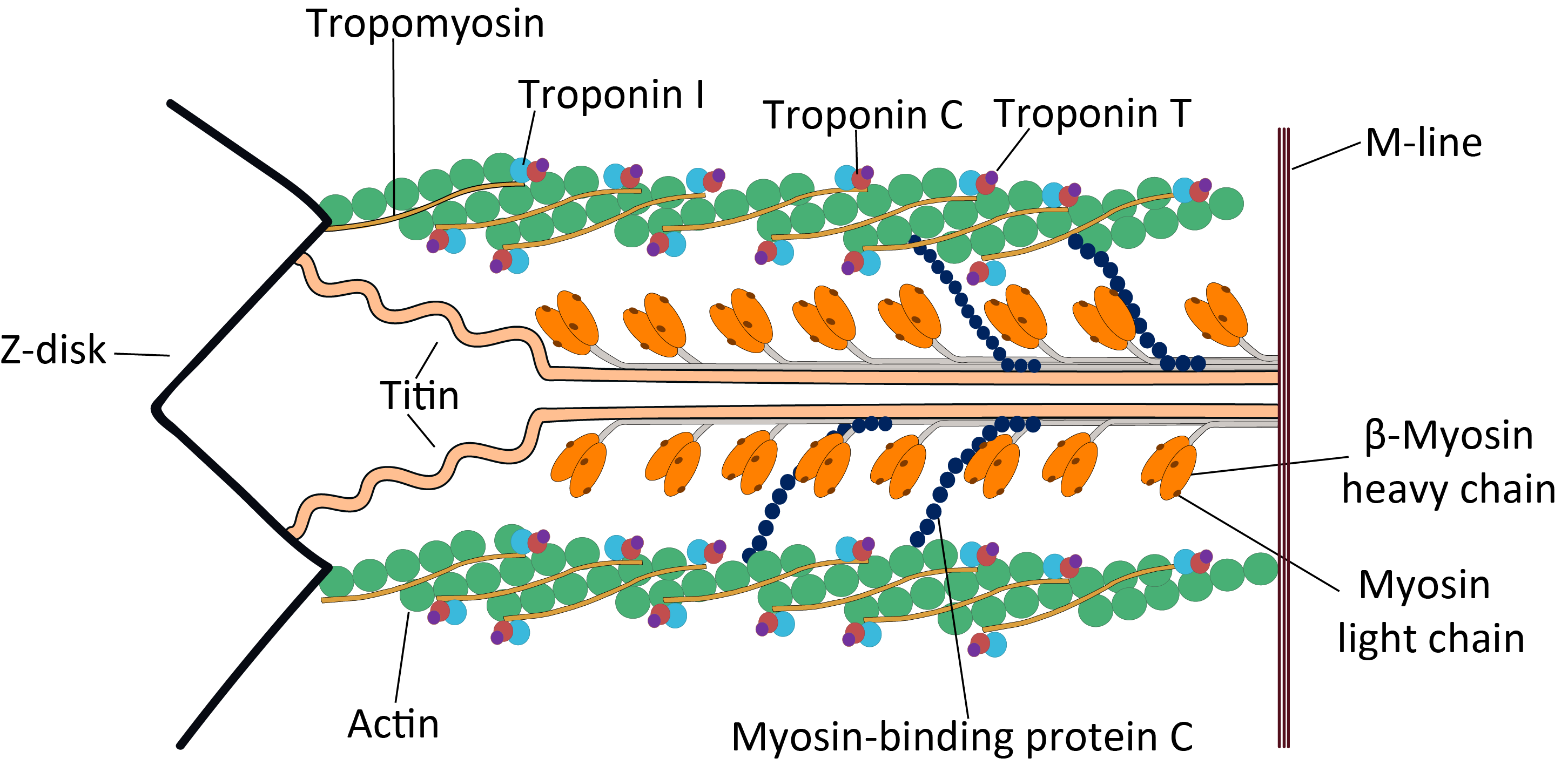
Cardiac sarcomere structure featuring troponin T

Troponin T (shortened TnT or TropT) is a part of the troponin complex, which are proteins integral to the contraction of skeletal and heart muscles. They are expressed in skeletal and cardiac myocytes. Troponin T binds to tropomyosin and helps position it on actin, and together with the rest of the troponin complex, modulates contraction of striated muscle.

The cardiac paralog of troponin T, TNNT2, is especially useful in the laboratory diagnosis of heart attack because it is released into the blood-stream when damage to heart muscle occurs. It was discovered by the German physician Hugo A. Katus at the University of Heidelberg, who also developed the cardiac troponin T assay.

== Subtypes ==
- Slow skeletal troponin T1, TNNT1 (19q13.4, 191041)
- Cardiac troponin T2, TNNT2 (1q32, 191045)
- Fast skeletal troponin T3, TNNT3 (11p15.5, 600692)

== Background ==
The troponin complex is responsible for coupling the sarcomere contraction cycle to variations in intracellular calcium concentration. Increased cardiac troponin T (cTnT) levels after an episode of chest pain might indicate myocardial infarction. It was discovered by the German physician Hugo A. Katus at the University of Heidelberg. He also developed the cTnT assay. In patients with non-severe asymptomatic aortic valve stenosis and no overt coronary artery disease, the increased cTnT (above 14 pg/mL) was found associated with an increased 5-year event rate of ischemic cardiac events (myocardial infarction, percutaneous coronary intervention, or coronary artery bypass surgery). In patients with stable coronary artery disease, the cTnT concentration has long been found to be significantly associated with the incidence of cardiovascular death and heart failure, but it was 2014 before it began to be accepted as a predictor of who would later suffer acute myocardial infarction (heart attack). A recent study has found an association between long-term excessive variation in blood pressure and elevations in cTnT levels.

== See also ==
- Troponin C
- Troponin I
- Calcium-binding protein
- Sliding filament model
