= Troponin I, fast skeletal muscle =

Protein-coding gene in the species Homo sapiens

TNNI2
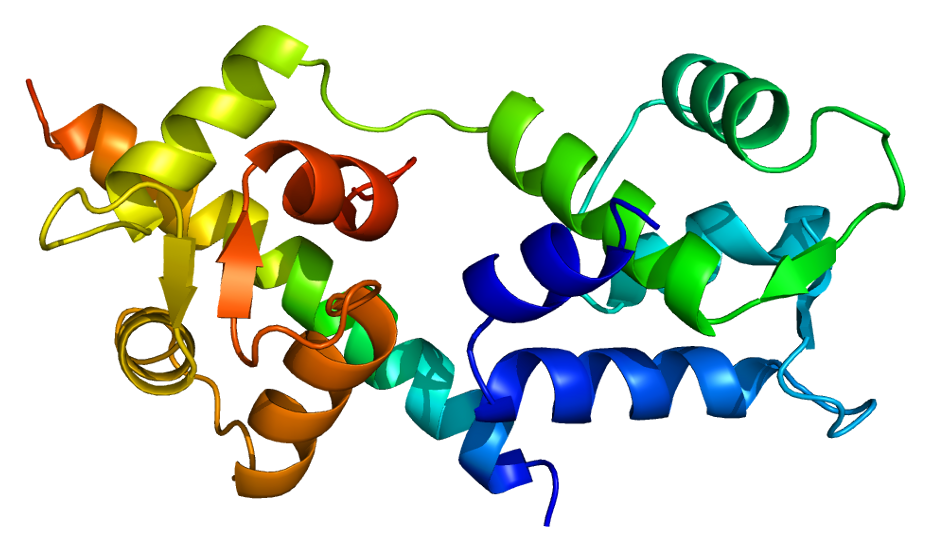

Identifiers
- Aliases: TNNI2, AMCD2B, DA2B, FSSV, fsTnI, troponin I2, fast skeletal type, DA2B1
- External IDs: OMIM: 191043; MGI: 105070; GeneCards: TNNI2
Available structures
PDB	Ortholog search: PDBe RCSB
PDB	List of PDB id codes 2MKP

Gene location (Human)
Chr.	Chromosome 11 (human)
Band	11p15.5	Start	1,838,981 bp
Band	11p15.5	End	1,841,680 bp

Gene location (Mouse)
Chr.	Chromosome 7 (mouse)
Band	7 F5|7 87.93 cM	Start	141,995,545 bp
Band	7 F5|7 87.93 cM	End	141,998,147 bp
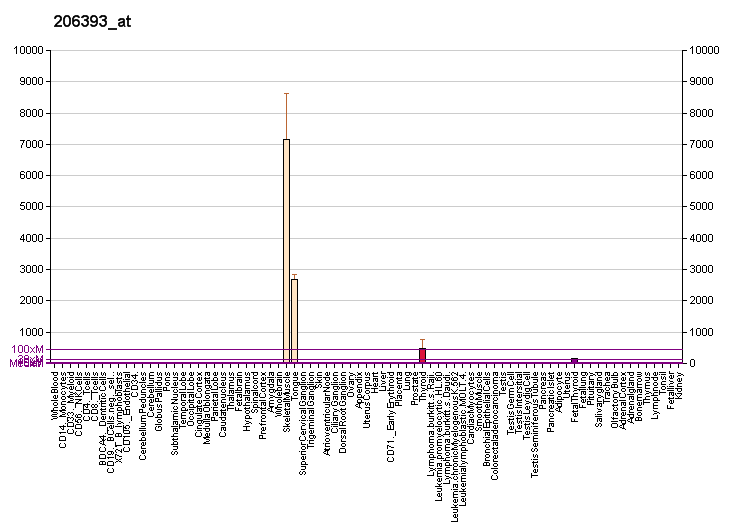
RNA expression pattern
Bgee	Human / Mouse (ortholog); Top expressed in: muscle of thigh; skeletal muscle tissue; gastrocnemius muscle; skin of leg; skin of abdomen; blood; minor salivary glands; granulocyte; monocyte; olfactory zone of nasal mucosa / Top expressed in: digastric muscle; sternocleidomastoid muscle; triceps brachii muscle; temporal muscle; medial head of gastrocnemius muscle; intercostal muscle; ankle; muscle of thigh; body of femur; esophagus; More reference expression data
BioGPS	More reference expression data
Gene ontology
Molecular function	actin binding; troponin T binding; protein binding
Cellular component	cytosol; troponin complex; nucleus
Biological process	regulation of muscle contraction; positive regulation of transcription, DNA-templated; skeletal muscle contraction; cardiac muscle contraction; muscle filament sliding; muscle contraction
Sources:Amigo / QuickGO
Orthologs
Databases	NCBI: entry; OMA: entry
Species	Human	Mouse
Entrez	7136	21953
Ensembl	ENSG00000130598; ENSG00000288219	ENSMUSG00000031097
UniProt	P48788	P13412
RefSeq (mRNA)	NM_003282; NM_001145829; NM_001145841	NM_009405
RefSeq (protein)	NP_001139301; NP_001139313; NP_003273	NP_033431
Location (UCSC)	Chr 11: 1.84 – 1.84 Mb	Chr 7: 142 – 142 Mb
PubMed search
- Wikidata
View/Edit Human	View/Edit Mouse

Troponin I, fast skeletal muscle is a protein that in humans is encoded by the TNNI2 gene.

The TNNI2 gene is located at 11p15.5 in the human chromosomal genome, encoding the fast twitch skeletal muscle troponin I (fsTnI). fsTnI is a 21.3 kDa protein consisting of 182 amino acids including the first methionine with an isoelectric point (pI) of 8.74. It is the inhibitory subunit of the troponin complex in fast twitch skeletal muscle fibers.

== Gene evolution ==
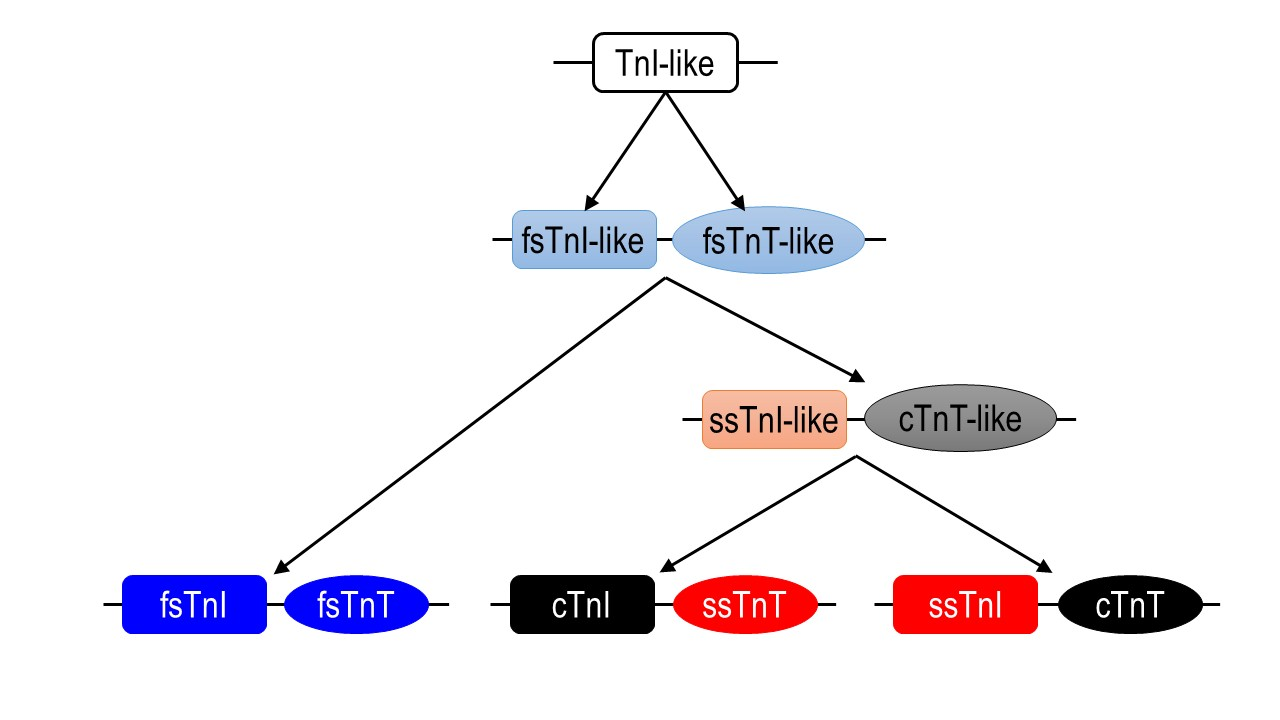
Figure 1: Evolutionary lineages of TnI-TnT gene pairs

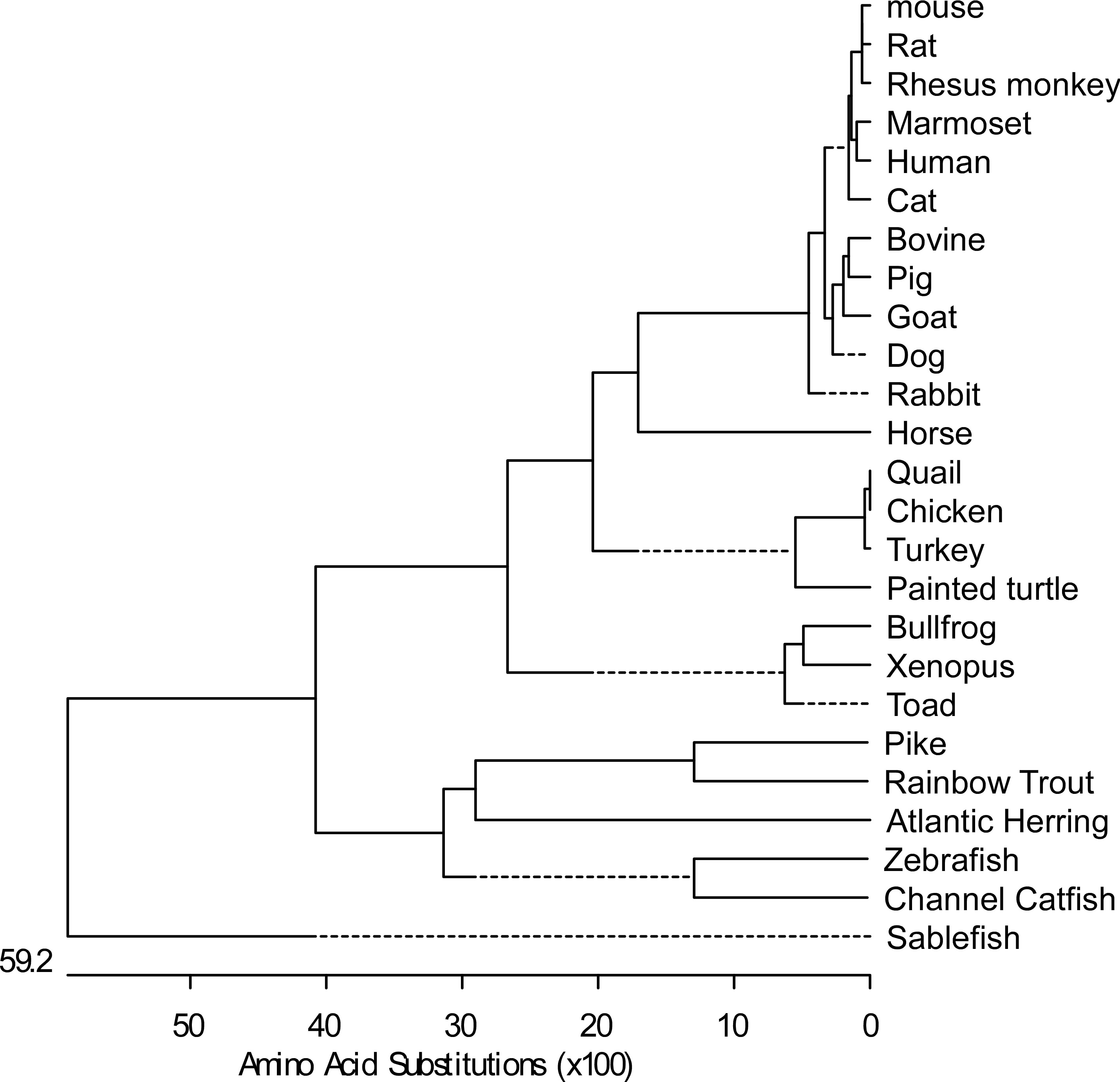
Figure 2: Evolutionary lineage of vertebrate fsTnI isoforms deduced from alignment of amino acid sequences.

Three homologous genes have evolved in vertebrates, encoding three muscle type-specific isoforms of TnI. Sequence analysis, immunological distance, and examination of evolutionarily suppressed conformational states showed that the TnI genes have evolved in close linkage with the genes encoding troponin T (TnT), another subunit of the troponin complex. The fast TnI-fast TnT gene pair represents the original TnI and TnT genes (Fig. 1). The three muscle fiber type-specific TnI-TnT gene pairs were likely originated from a TnI-like ancestor gene that presumably duplicated to form a closely linked fast TnI-like and fast TnT-like gene pair. A later duplication events resulted in emergences of a slow TnI-like and cardiac TnT-like gene pair that was further duplicated to give rise of the present-day slow TnI-cardiac TnT and cardiac TnI-slow TnT gene pairs. The seemingly scrambled ssTnI and cTnI gene pair is actually functionally related as they co-express and form troponin complex in the embryonic heart. The overlapping of enhancer elements of the TnT gene promoter with the upstream TnI gene structure may be a critical factor in the preservation of the close linkage of TnI and TnT gene pairs

The phylogenetic tree in Fig. 2 summarizes the evolutionary lineage of fsTnI isoforms in vertebrate species.

Phylogenetic analysis of vertebrate TnI isoforms demonstrated that each of the muscle type-specific isoforms is more conserved across species than the three isoforms in one given species, indicating early diverged functions of the muscle fiber type-specific isoforms as well as the conservation of functions for each muscle fiber type.

== Tissue distribution ==
Fast skeletal muscle TnI was first cloned from a skeletal muscle cDNA library. It is generally observed that fsTnI is exclusively expressed in fast twitch skeletal muscle fibers. More recent studies reported that subunits of fast skeletal muscle troponin (fsTnI, fsTnT, fsTnC) were expressed at significant levels in smooth muscle cells of mouse blood vessels, bladder and bronchi. Expression of fsTnI was also found in non-muscle cells, such as human corneal epithelial cells and cartilage. The function of fsTnI expressed in smooth muscle and non-muscle cells is unclear.

== Protein structure and function ==
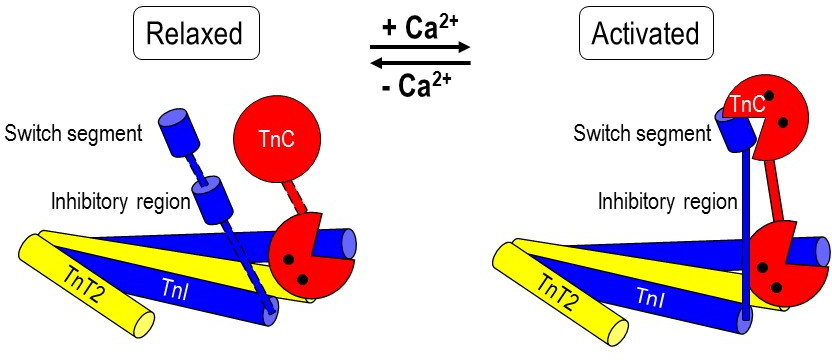
Figure 3: Conformational changes occurring in the troponin complex during muscle contraction and relaxation (modified from the model proposed by Vinogradova et al.

Crystallographic structure of fsTnI in troponin complex from chicken fast skeletal muscle showed an overall structure similar to that of cardiac troponin. The inhibitory region of fsTnI was resolved in skeletal troponin whereas it was invisible in the cardiac troponin crystal structure. Based on the crystal structure, a schematic illustration (Fig. 3) was proposed to show the conformational changes in troponin during muscle activation and relaxation.

=== Posttranslational modifications ===
Phosphorylation: Ser_{118} of fsTnI, equivalent to Ser_{150} in cTnI, was reported as a phosphorylation substrate of AMPK. As AMPK is a key regulator of cellular energetics, phosphorylation of this site may provide an adaptive mechanism during energy deprivation in both skeletal and cardiac muscles.

S-glutathionylation: fsTnI was found to be S-glutathionylated at Cys_{133} in rodent fast-twitch skeletal muscle and in human type II muscle fibers after exercise, which increased Ca^{2+} sensitivity of the contractile apparatus.

== Clinical significance ==
A missense mutation R174Q, a nonsense mutation R156X, and three single residue deletions DE167, DK175 and DK176, all in the C-terminal actin-tropomyosin interacting domain, have been found in patients with distal arthrogryposis.

Skeletal muscle TnI has been proposed as a sensitive and fast fiber-specific serum marker of skeletal muscle injury. fsTnI concentration in increased peripheral blood when fast twitch fibers were damaged.
