= Troponin I =

Muscle protein family

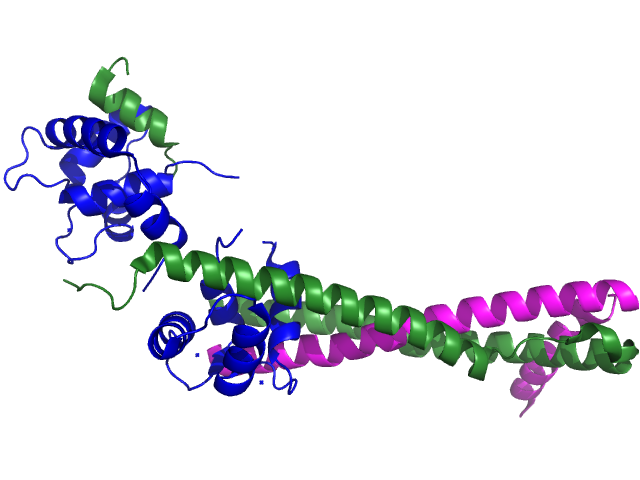
Representation of the human heart troponin nuclear complex (52 kDa nucleus) band in calcium-saturated form. Blue = troponin C; green = troponin I; magenta = troponin T.

Troponin

Troponin I is a cardiac and skeletal muscle protein family. It is a part of the troponin protein complex, where it binds to actin in thin myofilaments to hold the actin-tropomyosin complex in place. Troponin I prevents myosin from binding to actin in relaxed muscle. When calcium binds to the troponin C, it causes conformational changes which lead to dislocation of troponin I. Afterwards, tropomyosin leaves the binding site for myosin on actin leading to contraction of muscle. The letter I is given due to its inhibitory character.

The cardiac paralog (TNNI3, cTnI) is a useful marker in the laboratory diagnosis of heart attack. It occurs in different plasma concentration but the same circumstances as troponin T - either test can be performed for confirmation of cardiac muscle damage and laboratories usually offer one test or the other.

Three paralogs with unique tissue-specific expression patterns are expressed in humans, listed below with their locations and OMIM accessions:

- Slow-twitch skeletal muscle isoform troponin I, TNNI1 (1q31.3, 191042)
- Fast-twitch skeletal muscle isoform troponin I, TNNI2 (11p15.5, 191043)
- Cardiac troponin I, TNNI3 (19q13.4, 191044)

== History ==
Troponin was discovered in 1965. It was initially named heart myofibrillar apparatus protein component but was later renamed troponin. In 1971, Grieser and Gergely proved that troponin complex consists of three components, which, considering their specific properties, were named TnC, TnI and TnT. Over the following ten years, several groups of researchers started to demonstrate interest in the research of troponin, and the awareness of these proteins increased rapidly. When, finally, the amino acid sequences of troponin isoforms were determined, the opportunity to research functionally significant regions appeared.

== See also ==
- Sliding filament model
