= PRKCE =

Protein-coding gene in the species Homo sapiens

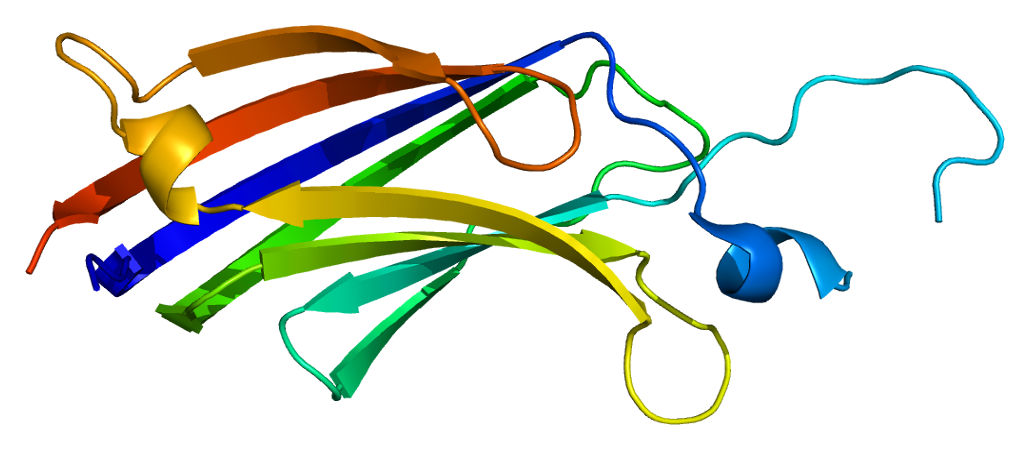

Identifiers
- Aliases: PRKCE, PKCE, nPKC-epsilon, protein kinase C epsilon
- External IDs: OMIM: 176975; MGI: 97599; GeneCards: PRKCE
Available structures
PDB	Ortholog search: PDBe RCSB
PDB	List of PDB id codes 2WH0
Enzyme activity
EC #	BRENDA	ExPASy	KEGG	MetaCyc
2.7.11.13	↗	↗	↗	↗

Gene location (Human)
Chr.	Chromosome 2 (human)
Band	2p21	Start	45,651,345 bp
Band	2p21	End	46,187,990 bp

Gene location (Mouse)
Chr.	Chromosome 17 (mouse)
Band	17|17 E4	Start	86,475,213 bp
Band	17|17 E4	End	86,965,347 bp
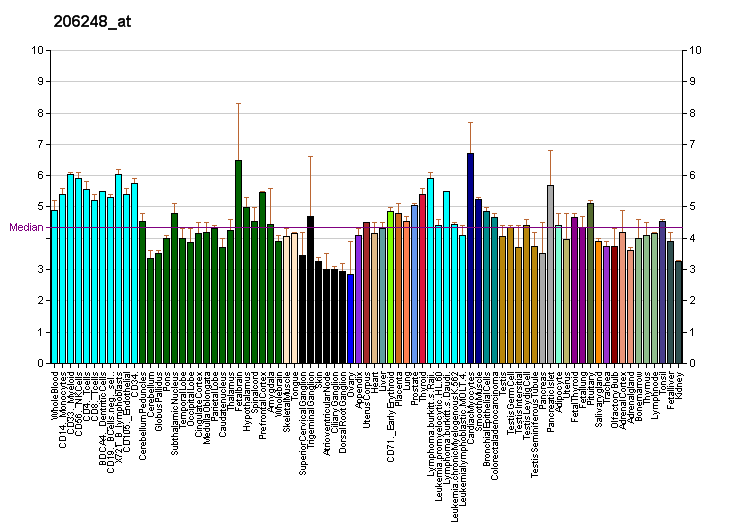
RNA expression pattern
Bgee	Human / Mouse (ortholog); Top expressed in: buccal mucosa cell; sural nerve; lateral nuclear group of thalamus; parietal lobe; postcentral gyrus; right lung; middle temporal gyrus; sperm; superior frontal gyrus; entorhinal cortex / Top expressed in: anterior amygdaloid area; subiculum; lateral septal nucleus; olfactory tubercle; dentate gyrus; prefrontal cortex; hippocampus proper; dentate gyrus of hippocampal formation granule cell; ventromedial nucleus; medial dorsal nucleus; More reference expression data
BioGPS	More reference expression data
Gene ontology
Molecular function	transferase activity; nucleotide binding; protein kinase activity; protein kinase C activity; actin monomer binding; 14-3-3 protein binding; signal transducer activity; metal ion binding; signaling receptor activator activity; protein serine/threonine kinase activity; kinase activity; protein binding; calcium-independent protein kinase C activity; enzyme binding; ethanol binding; enzyme activator activity; ATP binding
Cellular component	cytoplasm; cell periphery; cytosol; Golgi apparatus; membrane; plasma membrane; endoplasmic reticulum; mitochondrion; perinuclear region of cytoplasm; cytoskeleton; nucleus
Biological process	positive regulation of cell-substrate adhesion; release of sequestered calcium ion into cytosol; regulation of insulin secretion involved in cellular response to glucose stimulus; positive regulation of cellular glucuronidation; intracellular signal transduction; positive regulation of actin filament polymerization; cellular response to ethanol; Fc-gamma receptor signaling pathway involved in phagocytosis; phosphorylation; immune system process; regulation of release of sequestered calcium ion into cytosol; negative regulation of sodium ion transmembrane transporter activity; positive regulation of lipid catabolic process; positive regulation of wound healing; positive regulation of epithelial cell migration; positive regulation of synaptic transmission, GABAergic; TRAM-dependent toll-like receptor 4 signaling pathway; locomotory exploration behavior; platelet activation; positive regulation of cytokinesis; cell division; negative regulation of protein ubiquitination; protein phosphorylation; macrophage activation involved in immune response; response to morphine; positive regulation of signaling receptor activity; regulation of lipid metabolic process; cell adhesion; cellular response to prostaglandin E stimulus; peptidyl-serine phosphorylation; positive regulation of I-kappaB kinase/NF-kappaB signaling; cell cycle; positive regulation of mucus secretion; positive regulation of fibroblast migration; cellular response to hypoxia; lipopolysaccharide-mediated signaling pathway; signal transduction; positive regulation of insulin secretion; positive regulation of MAPK cascade; regulation of peptidyl-tyrosine phosphorylation; apoptotic process; positive regulation of protein localization to plasma membrane; positive regulation of catalytic activity
Sources:Amigo / QuickGO
Orthologs
Databases	NCBI: entry; OMA: entry
Species	Human	Mouse
Entrez	5581	18754
Ensembl	ENSG00000171132	ENSMUSG00000045038
UniProt	Q02156	P16054
RefSeq (mRNA)	NM_005400	NM_011104
RefSeq (protein)	NP_005391	NP_035234
Location (UCSC)	Chr 2: 45.65 – 46.19 Mb	Chr 17: 86.48 – 86.97 Mb
PubMed search
- Wikidata
View/Edit Human	View/Edit Mouse

Protein kinase C epsilon type (PKCε) is an enzyme that in humans is encoded by the PRKCE gene. PKCε is an isoform of the large PKC family of protein kinases that play many roles in different tissues. In cardiac muscle cells, PKCε regulates muscle contraction through its actions at sarcomeric proteins, and PKCε modulates cardiac cell metabolism through its actions at mitochondria. PKCε is clinically significant in that it is a central player in cardioprotection against ischemic injury and in the development of cardiac hypertrophy.

== Structure ==
Human PRKCE gene (Ensembl ID: ENSG00000171132) encodes the protein PKCε (Uniprot ID: Q02156), which is 737 amino acids in length with a molecular weight of 83.7 kDa. The PKC family of serine-threonine kinases contains thirteen PKC isoforms, and each isoform can be distinguished by differences in primary structure, gene expression, subcellular localization, and modes of activation. The epsilon isoform of PKC is abundantly expressed in adult cardiomyocytes, being the most highly expressed of all novel isoforms, PKC-δ, -ζ, and –η. PKCε and other PKC isoforms require phosphorylation at sites Threonine-566, Threonine-710, and Serine-729 for kinase maturation. The epsilon isoform of PKC differs from other isoforms by the position of the C2, pseudosubstrate, and C1 domains; various second messengers in different combinations can act on the C1 domain to direct subcellular translocation of PKCε.

Receptors for activated C-kinase (RACK) have been found to anchor active PKC in close proximity to substrates. PKCε appears to have preferred affinity to the (RACK/RACK2) isoform; specifically, the C2 domain of PKCε at amino acids 14–21 (also known as εV1-2) binds (RACK/RACK2), and peptide inhibitors targeting εV1-2 inhibit PKCε translocation and function in cardiomyocytes, while peptide agonists augment translocation. It has been demonstrated that altering the dynamics of the (RACK/RACK2) and (RACK1) interaction with PKCε can influence cardiac muscle phenotypes.

Activated PKCε translocates to various intracellular targets. In cardiac muscle, PKCε translocates to sarcomeres at Z-lines following α-adrenergic and endothelin (ET)_{A}-receptor stimulation. A myriad of agonists have also been shown to induce the translocation of PKCε from the cytosolic to particulate fraction in cardiomyocytes, including but not limited to PMA or norepinephrine;arachidonic acid;ET-1 and phenylephrine; angiotensin II and diastolic stretch; adenosine; hypoxia and Akt-induced stem cell factor; ROS generated via pharmacologic activation of the mitochondrial potassium-sensitive ATP channel (mitoK(ATP)) and the endogenous G-protein coupled receptor ligand, apelin.

== Function ==
Protein kinase C (PKC) is a family of serine- and threonine-specific protein kinases that can be activated by calcium and the second messenger diacylglycerol. PKC family members phosphorylate a wide variety of protein targets and are known to be involved in diverse cellular signaling pathways. PKC family members also serve as major receptors for phorbol esters, a class of tumor promoters. Each member of the PKC family has a specific expression profile and is believed to play a distinct role in cells. The protein encoded by this gene is one of the PKC family members. This kinase has been shown to be involved in many different cellular functions, such as apoptosis, cardioprotection from ischemia, heat shock response, as well as insulin exocytosis.

=== Cardiac muscle sarcomeric contractile function ===
PKCε translocates to cardiac muscle sarcomeres and modulates contractility of the myocardium. PKCε binds RACK2 at Z-lines with an EC_{50} of 86 nM; PKCε also binds at costameres to syndecan-4. PKCε has been shown to bind F-actin in neurons, which modulates synaptic function and differentiation; however it is unknown whether PKCε binds sarcomeric actin in muscle cells. Sarcomeric proteins have been identified in PKCε signaling complexes, including actin, cTnT, tropomyosin, desmin, and myosin light chain-2; in mice expressing a constitutively-active PKCε, all sarcomeric proteins showed greater association with PKCε, and the cTnT, tropomyosin, desmin and myosin light chain-2 exhibited changes in post-translational modifications.

PKCε binds and phosphorylates cardiac troponin I (cTnI) and cardiac troponin T (cTnT) in complex with troponin C (cTnC); phosphorylation on cTnI at residues Serine-43, Serine-45, and Threonine-144 cause depression of actomyosin S1 MgATPase function. These studies were further supported by those performed in isolated, skinned cardiac muscle fibers, showing that in vitro phosphorylation of cTnI by PKCε or Serine-43/45 mutation to Glutamate to mimic phosphorylation desensitized myofilaments to calcium and decreased maximal tension and filament sliding speed. Phosphorylation on cTnI at Serine-5/6 also showed this depressive effect. Further support was gained from in vivo studies in which mice expressing a mutant cTnI (Serine43/45Alanine) exhibited enhanced cardiac contractility.

=== Cardiac muscle mitochondrial metabolism and function ===
In addition to sarcomeres, PKCε also targets cardiac mitochondria. Proteomic analysis of PKCε signaling complexes in mice expressing a constitutively-active, overexpressed PKCε identified several interacting partners at mitochondria whose protein abundance and posttranslational modifications were altered in the transgenic mice. This study was the first to demonstrate PKCε at the inner mitochondrial membrane, and it was found that PKCε binds several mitochondrial proteins involved in glycolysis, TCA cycle, beta oxidation, and ion transport. However, it remained unclear how PKCε translocates from the outer to inner mitochondrial membrane until Budas et al. discovered that heat shock protein 90 (Hsp90) coordinates with the translocase of the outer mitochondrial membrane-20 (Tom20) to translocate PKCε following a preconditioning stimulus. Specifically, a seven amino acid peptide, termed TAT-εHSP90, homologous to the Hsp90 sequence within the PKCε C2 domain induced translocation of PKCε to the inner mitochondrial membrane and cardioprotection.

PKCε has also been shown to play a role in modulating mitochondrial permeability transition (MPT); the addition of PKCε to cardiomyocytes inhibits MPT, though the mechanism is unclear. Initially, PKCε was thought to protect mitochondria from MPT through its association with VDAC1, ANT, and hexokinase II; however, genetic studies have since ruled this out and subsequent studies have identified the F0/F1 ATP synthase as a core inner mitochondrial membrane component and Bax and Bak as potential outer membrane components These findings have opened up new avenues of investigation for the role of PKCε at mitochondria. Several likely targets of PKCε action affecting MPT have been discovered. PKCε interacts with ERK, JNKs and p38, and PKCε directly or indirectly phosphorylates ERK and subsequently Bad. PKCε also interacts with Bax in cancer cells, and PKCε modulates its dimerization and function. Activation of PKCε with the specific activator, εRACK, prior to ischemic injury has shown to be associated with phosphorylation of the F0/F1 ATP synthase. Moreover, the modulatory component, ANT is regulated by PKCε. These data suggest that PKCε may act at multiple modulatory targets of MPT function; further studies are required to unveil the specific mechanism.

== Clinical significance ==
=== Cardiac hypertrophy and heart failure ===
Findings of PKCε phosphorylation in animal models have been verified in humans; PKCε phosphorylates cTnI, cTnT, and MyBPC and depresses the sensitivity of myofilaments to calcium. PKCε induction occurs in the development of cardiac hypertrophy, following stimuli such as myotrophin, mechanical stretch and hypertension. The precise role of PKCε in hypertrophic induction has been debated. The inhibition of PKCε during transition from hypertrophy to heart failure enhances longevity; however, inhibition of PKCε translocation via a peptide inhibitor increases cardiomyocyte size and expression of hypertrophic gene panel. A role for focal adhesion kinase at costameres in strain-sensing and modulation of sarcomere length has been linked to hypertrophy. The activation of FAK by PKCε occurs following a hypertrophic stimulus, which modulates sarcomere assembly. PKCε also regulates CapZ dynamics following cyclic strain.

Transgenic studies involving PKCε have also shed light on its function in vivo. Cardiac-specific overexpression of constitutively-active PKCε (9-fold increase in PKCε protein, 4-fold increase in activity) induced cardiac hypertrophy characterizes by enhanced anterior and posterior left ventricular wall thickness. A later study unveiled that the aging of PKCε transgenic mice brought on dilated cardiomyopathy and heart failure by 12 months of age,] characterized by a preserved Frank-Starling mechanism and exhausted contractile reserve. Crossing PKCε transgenic mice with mutant cTnI mice lacking PKCε phosphorylation sites (Serine-43/Serine-45 mutated to Alanine) attenuated the contractile dysfunction and hypertrophic marker expression, offering critical mechanistic insights.

=== Cardioprotection against Ischemic injury ===
JM Downey was the first to introduce the role of PKC in cardioprotection against ischemia-reperfusion injury in 1994,; this seminal idea stimulated a series of studies which examined the different isoforms of PKC. PKCε has been demonstrated to be a central player in preconditioning in multiple independent studies, with its best known actions at cardiac mitochondria. It was first demonstrated by Ping et al. that in five distinct preconditioning regimens in conscious rabbits, the epsilon isoform of PKC specifically translocated from the cytosolic to particulate fraction. This finding was validated by multiple independent studies occurring shortly thereafter, and has since been observed in multiple animal models and human tissue, as well as in studies employing transgenesis and PKCε activators/inhibitors.

Mitochondrial targets of PKCε involved in cardioprotection have been actively pursued, since the translocation of PKCε to mitochondria following protective stimuli is one of the most well-accepted cardioprotective paradigms. PKCε has been shown to target and phosphorylate alcohol dehydrogenase 2 (ALDH2) following preconditioning stimuli, which increased the activity of ALDH2 and reduced infarct size. Moreover, PKCε interacts with cytochrome c oxidase subunit IV (COIV), and preconditioning stimuli evoked phosphorylation of COIV and stabilization of COIV protein and activity. The mitochondrial ATP-sensitive potassium channel (mitoK(ATP)) also interacts with PKCε; phosphorylation of mitoK(ATP) following preconditioning stimuli potentiates channel opening. PKCε modulates the interaction between subunit Kir6.1 of mitoK(ATP) and connexin-43, whose interaction confers cardioprotection. Lastly, several mitochondrial metabolic targets of PKCε phosphorylation involved in cardioprotection following activation with εRACK have been identified, including mitochondrial respiratory complexes I, II and III, as well as proteins involved in glycolysis, lipid oxidation, ketone body metabolism and heat shock proteins.

The role of PKCε acting in non-mitochondrial regions of cardiomyocytes is less well understood, though some studies have identified sarcomeric targets. PKCε translocation to sarcomeres and phosphorylation of cTnI and cMyBPC is involved in the κ-opioid- and α-adrenergic-dependent preconditioning that slows myosin cycling rate, thus protecting the contractile apparatus from damage. Activation of PKCε by εRACK prior to ischemia was also found to phosphorylate Ventricular myosin light chain-2, however the functional significance remains elusive. Actin-capping protein, CapZ appears to affect the localization of PKCε to Z-lines and modulates the cardiomyocyte response to ischemic injury. Cardioprotection in mice with reduction of CapZ showed enhancement in PKCε translocation to sarcomeres, thus suggesting that CapZ may compete with PKCε for the binding of RACK2.

=== Other functions ===
Knockout and molecular studies in mice suggest that this kinase is important for regulating behavioural response to morphine and alcohol. It also plays a role lipopolysaccharide (LPS)-mediated signaling in activated macrophages and in controlling anxiety-like behavior.

== Substrates and interactions ==
PKC-epsilon has a wide variety of substrates, including ion channels, other signalling molecules and cytoskeletal proteins.

PKC-epsilon has been shown to interact with:

- ACTA1,
- COPB2,
- CFTR,
- KRT1,
- GNB2L1,
- MYH9,
- VDAC1, and
- YWHAZ.

== See also ==
- Protein kinase C
