= CAPZA2 =

Protein-coding gene in humans

Identifiers
- Aliases: CAPZA2, CAPPA2, CAPZ, capping actin protein of muscle Z-line alpha subunit 2, capping actin protein of muscle Z-line subunit alpha 2
- External IDs: OMIM: 601571; MGI: 106222; GeneCards: CAPZA2

Gene location (Human)
Chr.	Chromosome 7 (human)
Band	7q31.2	Start	116,811,070 bp
Band	7q31.2	End	116,922,049 bp

Gene location (Mouse)
Chr.	Chromosome 6 (mouse)
Band	6 A2|6 7.96 cM	Start	17,636,233 bp
Band	6 A2|6 7.96 cM	End	17,666,971 bp
RNA expression pattern
Bgee	Human / Mouse (ortholog); Top expressed in: jejunal mucosa; monocyte; Skeletal muscle tissue of rectus abdominis; biceps brachii; right ventricle; Achilles tendon; Skeletal muscle tissue of biceps brachii; myocardium; tail of epididymis; mucosa of sigmoid colon / Top expressed in: triceps brachii muscle; vastus lateralis muscle; temporal muscle; sternocleidomastoid muscle; muscle of thigh; stroma of bone marrow; knee joint; Region I of hippocampus proper; ankle; digastric muscle; More reference expression data
BioGPS	n/a
Gene ontology
Molecular function	actin binding; actin filament binding; protein binding
Cellular component	F-actin capping protein complex; extracellular region; cytosol; cortical cytoskeleton; extracellular exosome; membrane; brush border; actin cytoskeleton; actin cortical patch
Biological process	barbed-end actin filament capping; innate immune response; blood coagulation; actin filament capping; endoplasmic reticulum to Golgi vesicle-mediated transport; antigen processing and presentation of exogenous peptide antigen via MHC class II; actin cytoskeleton organization; protein-containing complex assembly
Sources:Amigo / QuickGO
Orthologs
Databases	NCBI: entry; OMA: entry
Species	Human	Mouse
Entrez	830	12343
Ensembl	ENSG00000198898	ENSMUSG00000015733
UniProt	P47755	P47754
RefSeq (mRNA)	NM_006136	NM_007604
RefSeq (protein)	NP_006127	NP_031630
Location (UCSC)	Chr 7: 116.81 – 116.92 Mb	Chr 6: 17.64 – 17.67 Mb
PubMed search
- Wikidata
View/Edit Human	View/Edit Mouse

F-actin-capping protein subunit alpha-2 also known as CapZ-alpha2 is a protein that in humans is encoded by the CAPZA2 gene.

== Structure ==
CapZ-alpha2 is a 33.0 kDa protein composed of 286 amino acids. CAPZA2 is located on human chromosome 7, position q31.2-q31.3. The primary sequence of CapZ-alpha2 contains three C-terminal, regularly spaced leucines at positions 258, 262 and 266 found in consensus sequence of KxxxLxxE/DLxxALxxK/R that are critical for actin binding; these residues are conserved within the CapZ-beta isoform. CapZ-alpha2 is 85% identical to CapZ-alpha1, and differ by a small number of key amino acids; 21 amino acid differences perpetrate isoform specificity. CapZ-alpha2 is expressed in a variety of tissues, including cardiac muscle and skeletal muscle, where it caps sarcomeric actin at Z-discs; the ratio of CapZ-alpha2 to CapZ-alpha1 varies significantly among different tissues.

== Function ==
CapZ binds the barbed end of actin filaments and prevents addition or loss of actin monomers to filaments. It has also been observed that CapZ functions to organize myofilaments during myofibrillogenesis and is present at Z-discs in muscle prior to the striation of actin filaments, suggesting that CapZ may function to direct the polarity and organization of sarcomeric actin during I-band formation. The function of CapZ-alpha2 may be modulated by the calcium-binding protein S100A in skeletal and cardiac muscle tissues, as crosslinking studies have shown S100A to directly interact with the C-terminal region of CapZ-alpha in the presence of calcium. CapZ appears to regulate intracellular signaling of contractile proteins in cardiac muscle. It has been demonstrated that the presence of CapZ at Z-discs modulates the ability of protein phosphatase 1 (PP1) to dephosphorylate cardiac myofilament proteins, including myosin binding protein C, troponin T and myosin regulatory light chain; likely because extraction of CapZ decreased the amount of myofilament-associated PP1.

== Clinical Significance ==
In humans undergoing exercise-induced muscle damage via 300 maximal eccentric contractions, skeletal muscle biopsies subjected to DNA microarrays showed that CapZ-alpha expression was upregulated, suggesting that CapZ-alpha may be involved in skeletal muscle growth and remodeling, and/or stress management.

== Interactions ==
CapZ-alpha2 has been shown to interact with:

- ACTA1
- ACTC1
- S100A1
