= TPM2 =

Protein-coding gene in the species Homo sapiens

Identifiers
- Aliases: TPM2, AMCD1, DA1, DA2B, HEL-S-273, NEM4, TMSB, tropomyosin 2 (beta), tropomyosin 2, DA2B4
- External IDs: OMIM: 190990; MGI: 98810; GeneCards: TPM2

Gene location (Human)
Chr.	Chromosome 9 (human)
Band	9p13.3	Start	35,681,992 bp
Band	9p13.3	End	35,690,056 bp

Gene location (Mouse)
Chr.	Chromosome 4 (mouse)
Band	4|4 A5	Start	43,514,711 bp
Band	4|4 A5	End	43,523,765 bp
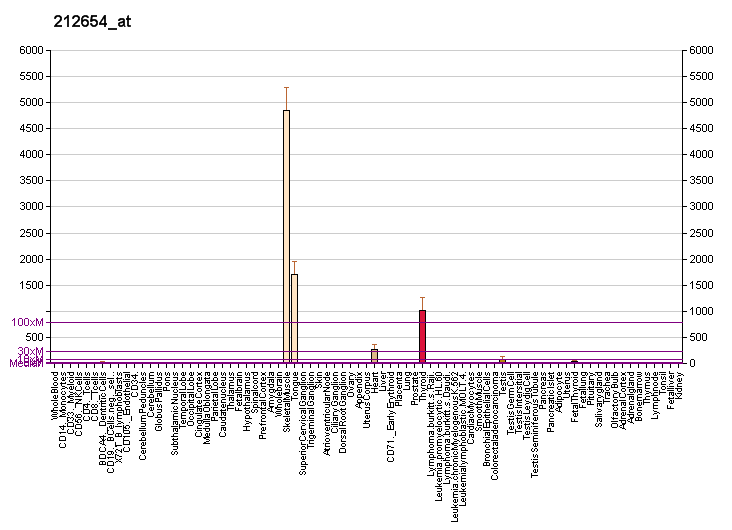

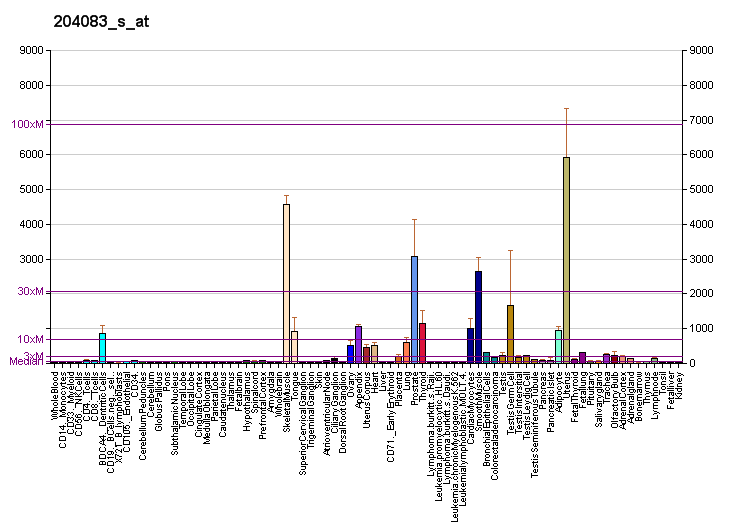
RNA expression pattern
Bgee	Human / Mouse (ortholog); Top expressed in: saphenous vein; popliteal artery; tibial arteries; Skeletal muscle tissue of rectus abdominis; muscle of thigh; gastric mucosa; right coronary artery; ascending aorta; Skeletal muscle tissue of biceps brachii; Descending thoracic aorta / Top expressed in: intercostal muscle; tunica media of zone of aorta; ascending aorta; ankle; sternocleidomastoid muscle; soleus muscle; muscle of thigh; temporal muscle; digastric muscle; triceps brachii muscle; More reference expression data
BioGPS	More reference expression data
Gene ontology
Molecular function	actin binding; structural constituent of muscle; identical protein binding; protein homodimerization activity; protein heterodimerization activity; actin filament binding
Cellular component	cytoplasm; muscle thin filament tropomyosin; cytosol; cytoskeleton; actin filament; actin cytoskeleton
Biological process	regulation of ATP-dependent activity; muscle filament sliding; muscle contraction; actin filament organization
Sources:Amigo / QuickGO
Orthologs
Databases	NCBI: entry; OMA: entry
Species	Human	Mouse
Entrez	7169	22004
Ensembl	ENSG00000198467	ENSMUSG00000028464
UniProt	P07951	P58774
RefSeq (mRNA)	NM_001145822; NM_001301226; NM_001301227; NM_003289; NM_213674	NM_001277875; NM_001277876; NM_009416
RefSeq (protein)	NP_001288155; NP_001288156; NP_003280; NP_998839	NP_001264804; NP_001264805; NP_033442
Location (UCSC)	Chr 9: 35.68 – 35.69 Mb	Chr 4: 43.51 – 43.52 Mb
PubMed search
- Wikidata
View/Edit Human	View/Edit Mouse

β-Tropomyosin, also known as tropomyosin beta chain, is a protein that in humans is encoded by the TPM2 gene. β-tropomyosin is striated muscle-specific coiled coil dimer that functions to stabilize actin filaments and regulate muscle contraction.

== Structure ==
β-tropomyosin is roughly 32 kDa in molecular weight (284 amino acids), but multiple splice variants exist. Tropomyosin is a flexible protein homodimer or heterodimer composed of two alpha-helical chains, which adopt a bent coiled coil conformation to wrap around the seven actin molecules in a functional unit of muscle. It is polymerized end to end along the two grooves of actin filaments and provides stability to the filaments. Tropomyosin dimers are composed of varying combinations of tropomyosin isoforms; human striated muscles express protein from the TPM1 (α-tropoomyosin), TPM2 (β-tropomyosin) and TPM3 (γ-tropomyosin) genes, with α-tropomyosin being the predominant isoform in striated muscle. Fast skeletal muscle and cardiac muscle contain more αα-homodimers, and slow skeletal muscle contains more ββ-homodimers. In human cardiac muscle the ratio of α-tropomyosin to β-tropomyosin is roughly 5:1. It has been shown that different combinations of tropomyosin isoforms bind troponin T with differing affinities, demonstrating that isoform combinations are used to impart a specific functional impact.

== Function ==
β-tropomyosin functions in association with α-tropomyosin and the troponin complex—composed of troponin I, troponin C and troponin T—to modulated the actin and myosin interaction. In diastole, the tropomyosin-troponin complex inhibits this interaction, and during systole the rise in intracellular calcium from sarcoplasmic reticulum binds to troponin C and induces a conformational change in the troponin-tropomyosin complex that disinhibits the actomyosin ATPase and permits contraction.

Specific functional insights into the function of the β-tropomyosin isoform have come from studies employing transgenesis. A study overexpressing β-tropomyosin in adult cardiac muscle evoked a 34-fold increase in expression of β-tropomyosin, resulting in preferential formation of the αβ-tropomyosin heterodimer. Transgenic hearts showed a significant delay in relaxation time as well as a decrease in the maximum rate of left ventricular relaxation. A more aggressive overexpression of β-tropomyosin (to over 75% of total tropomyosin) in the heart causes death of mice 10–14 days old, along with cardiac abnormalities, suggesting that the normal distribution of tropomyosin isoforms is critical to normal cardiac function.

In a disease model of cardiac hypertrophy, β-tropomyosin was shown to be reexpressed within two days following induction of pressure overload.

Studies from mice, which express 98% α-tropomyosin, have shown that α-tropomyosin can be phosphorylated at Serine-283, which is one amino acid away from the C-terminus. β-tropomyosin also has a Serine residue at position 283, thus, it is likely that β-tropomyosin is also phosphorylated. Mouse transgenic studies in which the phosphorylation site in α-tropomyosin is mutated to Alanine have shown that phosphorylation may function to modulate tropomyosin polymerization, head-to-tail interactions between adjacent tropomyosin molecules, cooperativity, myosin ATPase activity, and the cardiac response to stress.

== Clinical significance ==
A decrease in β-tropomyosin in patients with heart failure was demonstrated, as failing ventricles expressed solely α-tropomyosin.

Heterozygous mutations in TPM2 have been identified in patients with congenital cap myopathy, a rare disorder defined by cap-like structures in muscle fiber periphery.

Mutations in TPM2 have also been associated with nemaline myopathy, a rare disorder characterized by muscle weakness and nemaline bodies,

as well as distal arthrogryposis.

The muscle weakness observed in these patients may be due to a change in mutated TPM2 affinity for actin or decreased calcium-induced activation of contractility. Moreover, studies unveiled alterations in cross-bridge attachment and detachment rates, as well as changes in ATPase rates.

== Interactions ==
TPM2 has been shown to interact with:

- RRAD,
- PDLIM7,
- TNNT3, and
- TPM1.
