= DIPK2B =

Protein-coding gene in humans

Identifiers
- Aliases: DIPK2B, 4930578C19Rik, DIA1R, EPQL1862, PRO3743, bA435K1.1, chromosome X open reading frame 36, CXorf36, divergent protein kinase domain 2B
- External IDs: OMIM: 300959; MGI: 1923155; GeneCards: DIPK2B

Gene location (Human)
Chr.	X chromosome (human)
Band	Xp11.3	Start	45,148,373 bp
Band	Xp11.3	End	45,200,901 bp

Gene location (Mouse)
Chr.	X chromosome (mouse)
Band	X|X A1.3	Start	18,281,120 bp
Band	X|X A1.3	End	18,327,636 bp
RNA expression pattern
Bgee	Human / Mouse (ortholog); Top expressed in: apex of heart; subcutaneous adipose tissue; body of uterus; smooth muscle tissue; tendon of biceps brachii; canal of the cervix; sural nerve; left uterine tube; right lobe of thyroid gland; left ventricle / Top expressed in: embryo; muscle of thigh; esophagus; muscle tissue; proximal tubule; lip; skeletal muscle tissue; genital tubercle; right kidney; superior frontal gyrus; More reference expression data
BioGPS	n/a
Orthologs
Databases	NCBI: entry; OMA: entry
Species	Human	Mouse
Entrez	79742	75905
Ensembl	ENSG00000147113	ENSMUSG00000037358
UniProt	Q9H7Y0	Q8C3I9
RefSeq (mRNA)	NM_024689; NM_176819	NM_175228
RefSeq (protein)	NP_078965; NP_789789	NP_780437
Location (UCSC)	Chr X: 45.15 – 45.2 Mb	Chr X: 18.28 – 18.33 Mb
PubMed search
- Wikidata
View/Edit Human	View/Edit Mouse

Divergent protein kinase domain 2B is a protein which in humans is encoded by the gene DIPK2B (previously CXorf36). This protein is most highly expressed in the placenta and fat tissues, and it is predicted that this protein is extracellular, but otherwise the function is not currently very well understood. A notable homolog is DIPK2A.

== Gene ==
The location of the DIPK2B gene on chromosome X

It can be transcribed into 8 different transcript variants, which in turn can produce 6 different isoforms of the protein.

The genomic DNA is 52,529 base pairs long, while the longest mRNA that it produces is 4,735 bases long.

=== Gene Neighborhood ===
DIPK2B is closely surrounded by the following genes on chromosome X:

- DUSP21
- KDM6A
- MIR222
- TBX20

DIPK2B is also surrounded by two other genes on chromosome X that have been implicated in X-linked mental retardation.

- Synaptophysin
- CASK

== Protein ==
The longest protein isoform that is produced by the DIPK2B gene is termed hypothetical protein LOC79742 isoform 1 and is 433 amino acids long.

== Expression ==
DIPK2B is shown to be expressed ubiquitously at low levels in various tissues throughout the body. It is expressed highly in the ciliary ganglion, ovary, and uterus corpus. However, highest expression is seen in the trigeminal ganglion tissue.

== Conservation ==
DIPK2B has one paralog in humans known as DIPK2A. Orthologs have been found in all mammals and through numerous eukaryotes. However, conservation of the full gene halts past this, most likely a result of duplication from the ancestral gene into DIPK2B and DIPK2A. The full list of organisms in which orthologs have been found is given below.

- Pongo abelii
- Macaca mulatta
- Callithrix jacchus
- Canis familiaris
- Ailuropoda melanoleuca
- Equus caballus
- Oryctolagus cuniculus
- Mus musculus
- Rattus norvegicus
- Monodelphis domestica
- Ornithorhynchus anatinus
- Taeniopygia guttata
- Gallus gallus
- Danio rerio
- Bos taurus
