= PDLIM7 =

Protein-coding gene in the species Homo sapiens

Identifiers
- Aliases: PDLIM7, LMP1, LMP3, PDZ and LIM domain 7
- External IDs: OMIM: 605903; MGI: 1914649; GeneCards: PDLIM7
Available structures
PDB	Ortholog search: PDBe RCSB
PDB	List of PDB id codes 2Q3G

Gene location (Human)
Chr.	Chromosome 5 (human)
Band	5q35.3	Start	177,483,394 bp
Band	5q35.3	End	177,497,606 bp

Gene location (Mouse)
Chr.	Chromosome 13 (mouse)
Band	13|13 B1	Start	55,643,608 bp
Band	13|13 B1	End	55,661,489 bp
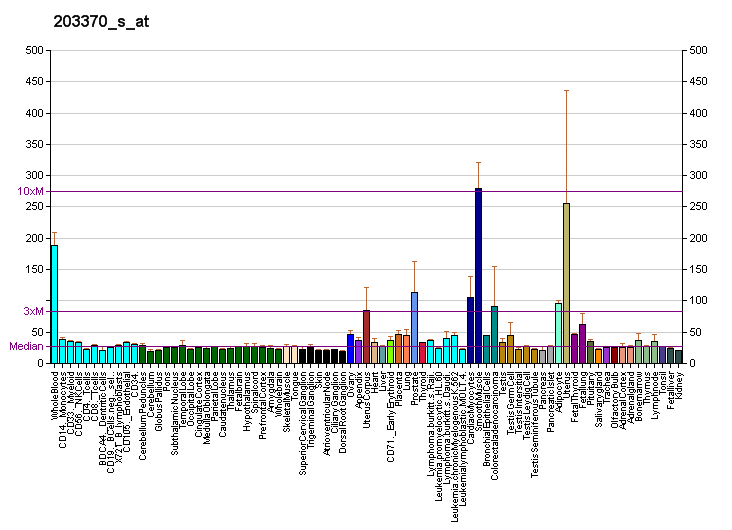

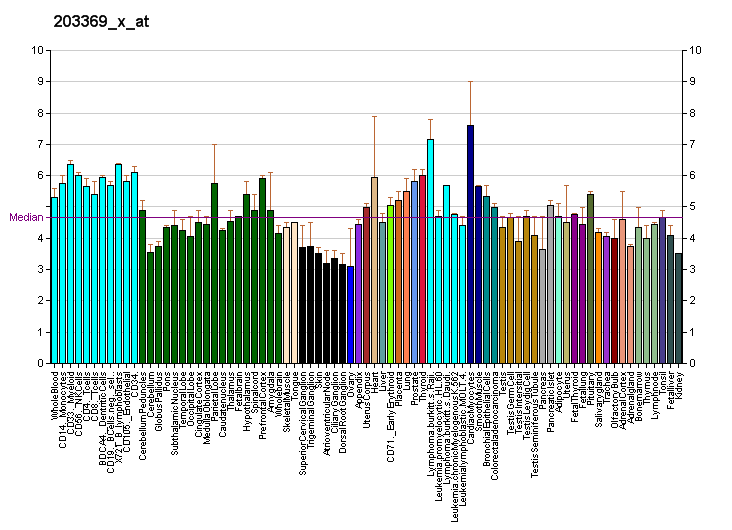

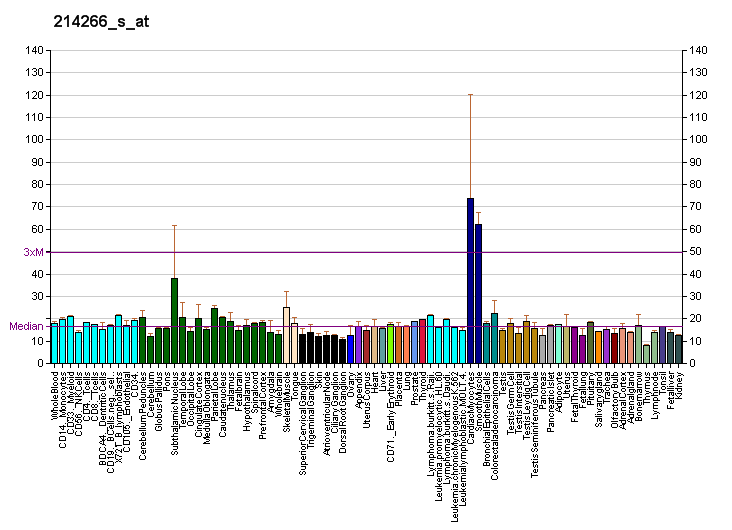
RNA expression pattern
Bgee	Human / Mouse (ortholog); Top expressed in: body of uterus; right coronary artery; ascending aorta; Descending thoracic aorta; popliteal artery; tibial arteries; left uterine tube; gastric mucosa; muscle layer of sigmoid colon; left coronary artery / Top expressed in: muscle of thigh; saccule; external carotid artery; granulocyte; internal carotid artery; otic placode; tunica media of zone of aorta; ascending aorta; otic vesicle; superior frontal gyrus; More reference expression data
BioGPS	More reference expression data
Gene ontology
Molecular function	protein binding; metal ion binding; actin binding; muscle alpha-actinin binding
Cellular component	cytoplasm; ruffle; cytoskeleton; nucleus; stress fiber; focal adhesion; actin cytoskeleton; cytosol; Z discdkac; filamentous actin
Biological process	multicellular organism development; cell differentiation; positive regulation of osteoblast differentiation; receptor-mediated endocytosis; actin cytoskeleton organization; ossification; axon guidance; development of the heart; muscle structure development
Sources:Amigo / QuickGO
Orthologs
Databases	NCBI: entry; OMA: entry
Species	Human	Mouse
Entrez	9260	67399
Ensembl	ENSG00000196923	ENSMUSG00000021493
UniProt	Q9NR12	Q3TJD7
RefSeq (mRNA)	NM_005451; NM_203352; NM_203353; NM_213636	NM_001114087; NM_001114088; NM_026131
RefSeq (protein)	NP_005442; NP_976227; NP_998801	NP_001107559; NP_001107560; NP_080407
Location (UCSC)	Chr 5: 177.48 – 177.5 Mb	Chr 13: 55.64 – 55.66 Mb
PubMed search
- Wikidata
View/Edit Human	View/Edit Mouse

PDZ and LIM domain protein 7 is a protein that in humans is encoded by the PDLIM7 gene.

The protein encoded by this gene is representative of a family of proteins composed of conserved PDZ and LIM domains. LIM domains are proposed to function in protein–protein recognition in a variety of contexts including gene transcription and development and in cytoskeletal interaction. The LIM domains of this protein bind to protein kinases, whereas the PDZ domain binds to actin filaments. The gene product is involved in the assembly of an actin filament-associated complex essential for transmission of ret/ptc2 mitogenic signaling. The biological function is likely to be that of an adapter, with the PDZ domain localizing the LIM-binding proteins to actin filaments of both skeletal muscle and nonmuscle tissues. Alternative splicing of this gene results in multiple transcript variants.

== Interactions ==
PDLIM7 has been shown to interact with TPM2.
