= Capping protein (actin filament) muscle Z-line, alpha 1 =

Protein found in humans

CAPZA1
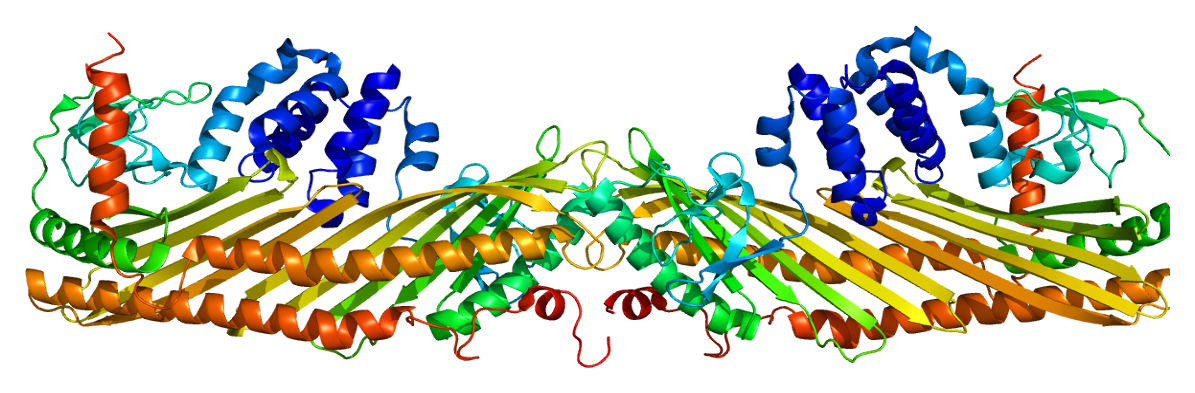

Identifiers
- Aliases: CAPZA1, CAPPA1, CAPZ, CAZ1, capping actin protein of muscle Z-line alpha subunit 1, capping actin protein of muscle Z-line subunit alpha 1
- External IDs: OMIM: 601580; MGI: 106227; GeneCards: CAPZA1
Available structures
| PDB | Ortholog search: PDBe RCSB |
| PDB | List of PDB id codes 1MQ1, 1MWN |

Gene location (Human)
| Chr. | Chromosome 1 (human) |
| Band | 1p13.2 | Start | 112,619,805 bp |
| Band | 1p13.2 | End | 112,671,616 bp |

Gene location (Mouse)
| Chr. | Chromosome 3 (mouse) |
| Band | 3 F2.2|3 45.88 cM | Start | 104,730,095 bp |
| Band | 3 F2.2|3 45.88 cM | End | 104,771,821 bp |
RNA expression pattern
| Bgee | Human / Mouse (ortholog); Top expressed in: epithelium of nasopharynx; gingival epithelium; bone marrow; germinal epithelium; mucosa of pharynx; monocyte; trabecular bone; skin of thigh; oral cavity; bone marrow cell / Top expressed in: granulocyte; tail of embryo; thymus; spermatocyte; yolk sac; genital tubercle; ventricular zone; ileum; stomach; neural tube; More reference expression data |
| BioGPS | n/a |
Gene ontology
| Molecular function | actin binding; protein binding; cadherin binding; actin filament binding |
| Cellular component | F-actin capping protein complex; cytoplasm; extracellular region; cytosol; WASH complex; extracellular exosome; cytoskeleton; actin cytoskeleton; actin cortical patch |
| Biological process | barbed-end actin filament capping; innate immune response; blood coagulation; actin filament capping; endoplasmic reticulum to Golgi vesicle-mediated transport; antigen processing and presentation of exogenous peptide antigen via MHC class II; interleukin-12-mediated signaling pathway; cell junction assembly; actin cytoskeleton organization; protein-containing complex assembly |
Sources:Amigo / QuickGO
Orthologs
| Databases | NCBI: entry; OMA: entry |
| Species | Human | Mouse |
| Entrez | 829 | 12340 |
| Ensembl | ENSG00000116489 | ENSMUSG00000070372 |
| UniProt | P52907 | P47753 |
| RefSeq (mRNA) | NM_006135 | NM_009797; NM_001355044 |
| RefSeq (protein) | NP_006126 | NP_033927; NP_001341973 |
| Location (UCSC) | Chr 1: 112.62 – 112.67 Mb | Chr 3: 104.73 – 104.77 Mb |
| PubMed search |
- Wikidata
| View/Edit Human | View/Edit Mouse |

F-actin-capping protein subunit alpha-1 is a protein that in humans is encoded by the CAPZA1 gene.

CAPZA1 is a member of the F-actin capping protein alpha subunit family. This gene encodes the alpha subunit of the barbed-end actin binding protein.

== Function ==
The protein regulates growth of the actin filament by capping the barbed end (plus-end) of growing actin filaments, preventing any further assembly from occurring. This protein can bind to the lipid PIP_{2}, preventing it from binding to actin filaments.
