= TPM1 =

Protein-coding gene in the species Homo sapiens

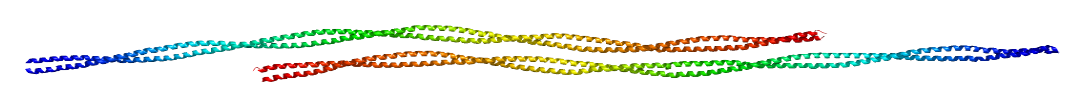

Identifiers
- Aliases: TPM1, C15orf13, CMD1Y, CMH3, HTM-alpha, LVNC9, TMSA, HEL-S-265, tropomyosin 1 (alpha), tropomyosin 1
- External IDs: OMIM: 191010; MGI: 98809; GeneCards: TPM1

Gene location (Human)
Chr.	Chromosome 15 (human)
Band	15q22.2	Start	63,042,632 bp
Band	15q22.2	End	63,071,915 bp

Gene location (Mouse)
Chr.	Chromosome 9 (mouse)
Band	9 C|9 36.27 cM	Start	66,929,872 bp
Band	9 C|9 36.27 cM	End	66,956,688 bp
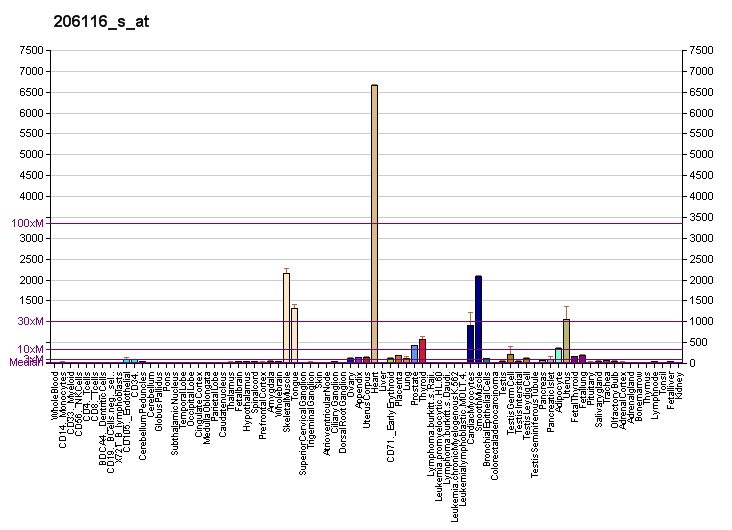

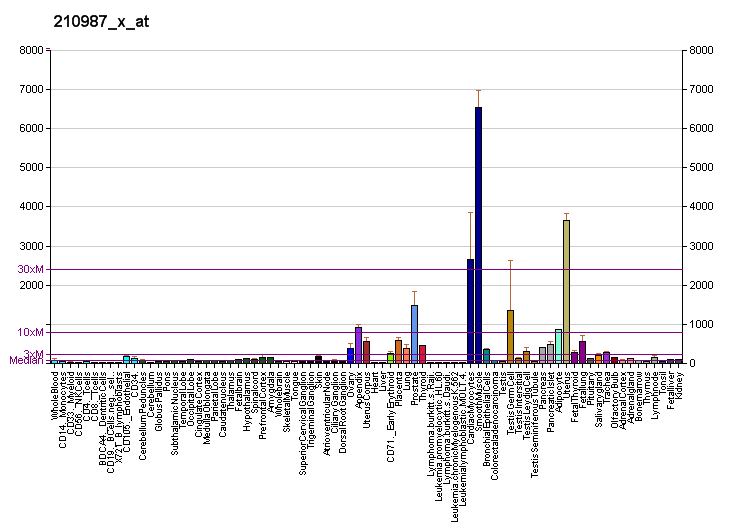

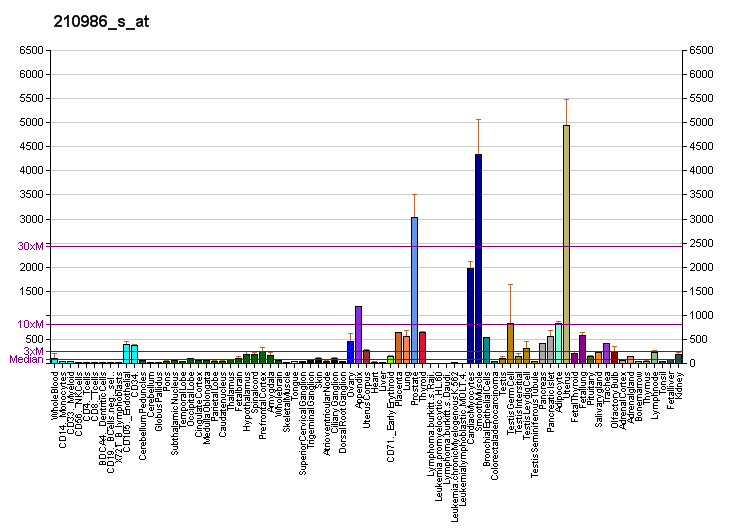
RNA expression pattern
Bgee	Human / Mouse (ortholog); Top expressed in: myocardium of left ventricle; right ventricle; atrium; right auricle of heart; seminal vesicula; apex of heart; cardiac muscle tissue of right atrium; Skeletal muscle tissue of rectus abdominis; saphenous vein; muscle layer of sigmoid colon / Top expressed in: ankle; aortic valve; medial head of gastrocnemius muscle; tail of embryo; ascending aorta; masseter muscle; muscle of thigh; triceps brachii muscle; temporal muscle; sternocleidomastoid muscle; More reference expression data
BioGPS	More reference expression data
Gene ontology
Molecular function	cytoskeletal protein binding; structural constituent of cytoskeleton; protein binding; actin binding; structural constituent of muscle; identical protein binding; protein homodimerization activity; protein heterodimerization activity; actin filament binding
Cellular component	cytoplasm; muscle thin filament tropomyosin; sarcomere; stress fiber; ruffle membrane; bleb; cytoskeleton; cytosol; actin filament; actin cytoskeleton; myofibril; filamentous actin
Biological process	regulation of muscle contraction; muscle contraction; regulation of heart contraction; positive regulation of ATP-dependent activity; negative regulation of vascular associated smooth muscle cell migration; negative regulation of vascular associated smooth muscle cell proliferation; ruffle organization; wound healing; cellular response to reactive oxygen species; negative regulation of cell migration; cytoskeleton organization; regulation of cell shape; muscle filament sliding; sarcomere organization; positive regulation of stress fiber assembly; positive regulation of cell adhesion; actin filament organization; in utero embryonic development; positive regulation of heart rate by epinephrine; ventricular cardiac muscle tissue morphogenesis; cardiac muscle contraction
Sources:Amigo / QuickGO
Orthologs
Databases	NCBI: entry; OMA: entry
Species	Human	Mouse
Entrez	7168	22003
Ensembl	ENSG00000140416	ENSMUSG00000032366
UniProt	P09493	P58771
RefSeq (mRNA)	NM_000366; NM_001018004; NM_001018005; NM_001018006; NM_001018007 NM_001018008; NM_001018020; NM_001301244; NM_001301289; NM_001330344; NM_001330346; NM_001330351; NM_001365776; NM_001365777; NM_001365778; NM_001365779; NM_001365780; NM_001365781; NM_001365782	NM_001164248; NM_001164249; NM_001164250; NM_001164251; NM_001164252 NM_001164253; NM_001164254; NM_001164255; NM_001164256; NM_024427
RefSeq (protein)	NP_000357; NP_001018004; NP_001018005; NP_001018006; NP_001018007 NP_001018008; NP_001018020; NP_001288173; NP_001288218; NP_001317273; NP_001317275; NP_001317280; NP_001352705; NP_001352706; NP_001352707; NP_001352708; NP_001352709; NP_001352710; NP_001352711; NP_001018006.1	NP_001157720; NP_001157721; NP_001157722; NP_001157723; NP_001157724 NP_001157725; NP_001157726; NP_001157727; NP_001157728; NP_077745
Location (UCSC)	Chr 15: 63.04 – 63.07 Mb	Chr 9: 66.93 – 66.96 Mb
PubMed search
- Wikidata
View/Edit Human	View/Edit Mouse

Tropomyosin alpha-1 chain is a protein that in humans is encoded by the TPM1 gene. This gene is a member of the tropomyosin (Tm) family of highly conserved, widely distributed actin-binding proteins involved in the contractile system of striated and smooth muscles and the cytoskeleton of non-muscle cells.

== Structure ==
Tm is a 32.7 kDa protein composed of 284 amino acids. Tm is a flexible protein homodimer or heterodimer composed of two alpha-helical chains, which adopt a bent coiled coil conformation to wrap around the seven actin molecules in a functional unit of muscle. It is polymerized end to end along the two grooves of actin filaments and provides stability to the filaments. Human striated muscles express protein from the TPM1 (α-Tm), TPM2 (β-Tm) and TPM3 (γ-Tm) genes, with α-Tm being the predominant isoform in striated muscle. In human cardiac muscle the ratio of α-Tm to β-Tm is roughly 5:1.

== Function ==
Tm functions in association with the troponin complex to regulate the calcium-dependent interaction of actin and myosin during muscle contraction. Tm molecules are arranged head-to-tail along the actin thin filament, and are a key component in cooperative activation of muscle. A three state model has been proposed by McKillop and Geeves, which describes the positions of Tm during a cardiac cycle. The blocked (B) state occurs in diastole when intracellular calcium is low and Tm blocks the myosin binding site on actin. The closed (C) state is when Tm is positioned on the inner groove of actin; in this state myosin is in a "cocked" position where heads are weakly bound and not generating force. The myosin binding (M) state is when Tm is further displaced from actin by myosin crossbridges that are strongly-bound and actively generating force. In addition to actin, Tm binds troponin T (TnT). TnT tethers the region of head-to-tail overlap of subsequent Tm molecules to actin.

== Clinical Significance ==
Mutations in TPM1 have been associated with hypertrophic cardiomyopathy (HCM), dilated cardiomyopathy and left ventricular noncompaction cardiomyopathy (LVNC). HCM mutations tend to cluster around the N-terminal region and a primary actin binding region known as period 5.
