= MIB2 (gene) =

Protein-coding gene in humans

Identifiers
- Aliases: MIB2, ZZANK1, ZZZ5, mindbomb E3 ubiquitin protein ligase 2, MIB E3 ubiquitin protein ligase 2
- External IDs: OMIM: 611141; MGI: 2679684; GeneCards: MIB2
Enzyme activity
EC #	BRENDA	ExPASy	KEGG	MetaCyc
2.3.2.27	↗	↗	↗	↗

Gene location (Human)
Chr.	Chromosome 1 (human)
Band	1p36.33	Start	1,615,454 bp
Band	1p36.33	End	1,630,605 bp

Gene location (Mouse)
Chr.	Chromosome 4 (mouse)
Band	4|4 E2	Start	155,739,134 bp
Band	4|4 E2	End	155,753,655 bp
RNA expression pattern
Bgee	Human / Mouse (ortholog); Top expressed in: granulocyte; apex of heart; anterior pituitary; right ovary; left ovary; right hemisphere of cerebellum; right uterine tube; muscle of thigh; left uterine tube; skin of abdomen / Top expressed in: granulocyte; primary visual cortex; superior frontal gyrus; internal carotid artery; external carotid artery; cerebellar cortex; dentate gyrus of hippocampal formation granule cell; subiculum; Rostral migratory stream; neural layer of retina; More reference expression data
BioGPS	n/a
Gene ontology
Molecular function	signal transducer activity; zinc ion binding; ubiquitin protein ligase activity; metal ion binding; actin binding; protein binding; ubiquitin-protein transferase activity; transferase activity
Cellular component	cytoplasm; endosome; early endosome; ubiquitin ligase complex; cytosol
Biological process	Notch signaling pathway; positive regulation of I-kappaB kinase/NF-kappaB signaling; protein ubiquitination; protein polyubiquitination
Sources:Amigo / QuickGO
Orthologs
Databases	NCBI: entry; OMA: entry
Species	Human	Mouse
Entrez	142678	76580
Ensembl	ENSG00000197530	ENSMUSG00000029060
UniProt	Q96AX9	Q8R516
RefSeq (mRNA)	NM_001170686; NM_001170687; NM_001170688; NM_001170689; NM_080875	NM_001256107; NM_001256108; NM_001256110; NM_145124; NM_001369161 NM_001369162; NM_001369163; NM_001369164; NM_001369165; NM_001369166; NM_001369167; NM_001369168
RefSeq (protein)	NP_001164157; NP_001164158; NP_001164159; NP_001164160; NP_543151	NP_001243036; NP_001243037; NP_660106; NP_001356090; NP_001356091 NP_001356092; NP_001356093; NP_001356094; NP_001356095; NP_001356096; NP_001356097
Location (UCSC)	Chr 1: 1.62 – 1.63 Mb	Chr 4: 155.74 – 155.75 Mb
PubMed search
- Wikidata
View/Edit Human	View/Edit Mouse

E3 ubiquitin-protein ligase MIB2 is an enzyme that in humans is encoded by the MIB2 gene.

== Interactions ==
MIB2 (gene) has been shown to interact with Actin, alpha 1.
