= Cardioprotection =

Mechanisms that contribute to the preservation of the heart

Cardioprotection includes all mechanisms and means that contribute to the preservation of the heart by reducing or even preventing myocardial damage.

== Mechanisms ==
Cardioprotection encompasses several regimens that have shown to preserve function and viability of cardiac muscle cell tissue subjected to ischemic insult or reoxygenation.

Cardioprotection includes strategies that are implemented:

- before an ischemic event (preconditioning, PC),
- during an ischemic event (perconditioning, PerC),
- after the event and during reperfusion (postconditioning, PostC).

These strategies can be further stratified by performing the intervention locally or remotely, creating classes of conditioning known as remote ischemic PC (RIPC), remote ischemic PostC and remote ischemic PerC. Classical (local) preconditioning has an early phase with an immediate onset lasting 2–3 hours that protects against myocardial infarction. The early phase involves post-translational modification of preexisting proteins, brought about by the activation of G protein-coupled receptors as well as downstream MAPK's and PI3/Akt. These signaling events act on the ROS-generating mitochondria, activate PKCε and the Reperfusion Injury Salvage Kinase (RISK) pathway, preventing mitochondrial permeability transition pore (MTP) opening. The late phase with an onset of 12–24 hours that lasts 3–4 days and protects against both infarction and reversible postischemic contractile dysfunction, termed myocardial stunning. This phase involves the synthesis of new cardioprotective proteins stimulated by nitric oxide (NO), Reactive oxygen species (ROS) and adenosine acting on kinases such as PKCε and Src, which in turn activate gene transcription and upregulation of late PC molecular players (e.g., antioxidant enzymes, iNOS).

A role for PKCε in more contemporary cardioprotection strategies including RIPC, local PostC, and remote PostC have been either demonstrated or suggested. It was shown that PKCε translocates from the cytosolic to the particulate fraction upon RIPC induction and that the protection conferred by RIPC can be inhibited with the PKC inhibitor chelerythrine Similarly, in models of local PostC, phosphorylation and activation of PKCε has been shown to be induced and PKCε inhibition attenuated the beneficial effects of these regimens. A recent study showed that blocking Hsp90 function with geldanamycin inhibits PostC protection and PKCε translocation. Additional studies are required to investigate a role for PKCε in remote PostC and PerC, as this has not been conclusively demonstrated.

== Clinical relevance ==
Cardioprotective strategies are studied for their potential to reduce heart damage in conditions like heart attack or surgery involving reperfusion.
