= Troponin T, cardiac muscle =

Protein found in humans

TNNT2
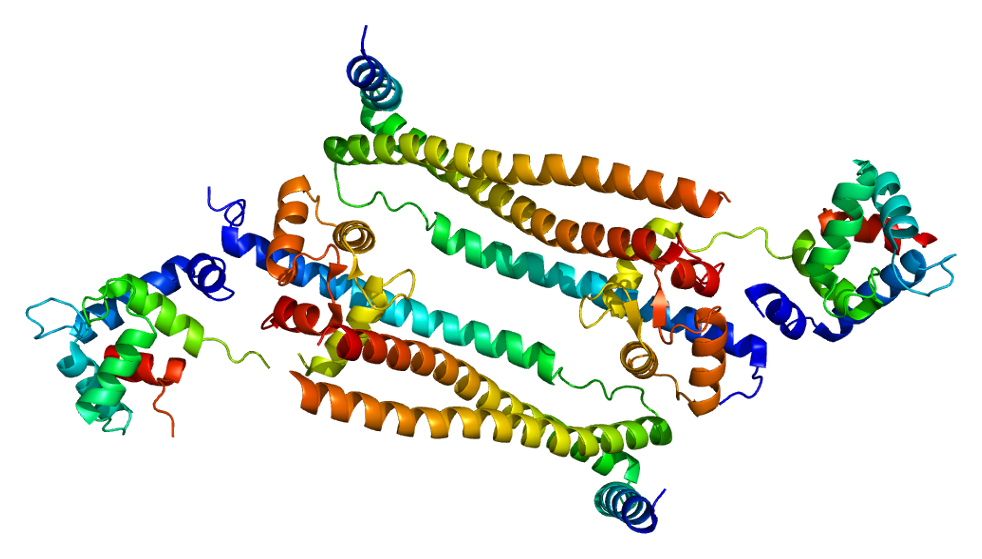

Identifiers
- Aliases: TNNT2, CMD1D, CMH2, CMPD2, LVNC6, RCM3, TnTC, cTnT, troponin T2, cardiac type
- External IDs: OMIM: 191045; MGI: 104597; GeneCards: TNNT2
Available structures
| PDB | Ortholog search: PDBe RCSB |
| PDB | List of PDB id codes 1J1D, 1J1E, 4Y99 |

Gene location (Human)
| Chr. | Chromosome 1 (human) |
| Band | 1q32.1 | Start | 201,359,008 bp |
| Band | 1q32.1 | End | 201,377,764 bp |

Gene location (Mouse)
| Chr. | Chromosome 1 (mouse) |
| Band | 1 E4|1 59.32 cM | Start | 135,764,092 bp |
| Band | 1 E4|1 59.32 cM | End | 135,779,998 bp |
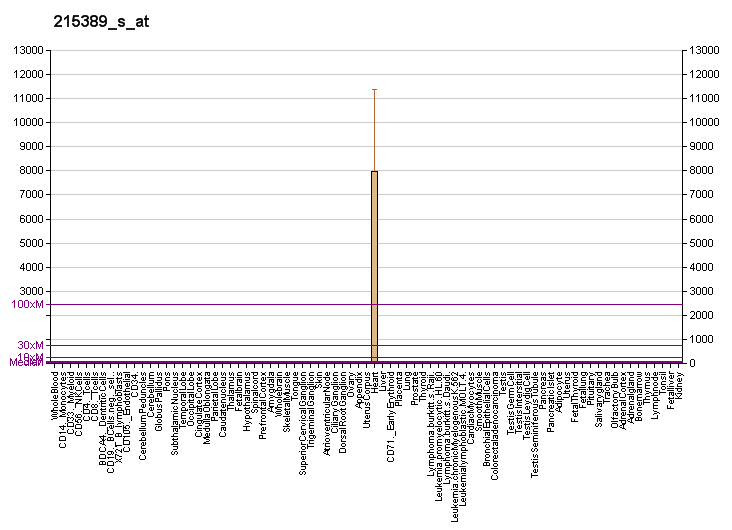
RNA expression pattern
| Bgee | Human / Mouse (ortholog); Top expressed in: apex of heart; right auricle of heart; left ventricle; sural nerve; right frontal lobe; skin of leg; Brodmann area 9; skin of abdomen; anterior cingulate cortex; right lung / Top expressed in: atrioventricular valve; atrium; myocardium of ventricle; left ventricle; aortic valve; cardiac muscles; interventricular septum; cardiac muscle tissue of left ventricle; right ventricle; endocardial cushion; More reference expression data |
| BioGPS | More reference expression data |
Gene ontology
| Molecular function | protein-macromolecule adaptor activity; ATPase activity; protein binding; actin binding; tropomyosin binding; troponin C binding; troponin I binding; calcium ion binding; calcium-dependent ATPase activity |
| Cellular component | cytosol; troponin complex; sarcomere; striated muscle thin filament; myofibril; cardiac myofibril; cardiac Troponin complex |
| Biological process | regulation of muscle contraction; muscle contraction; regulation of heart contraction; positive regulation of ATP-dependent activity; negative regulation of ATP-dependent activity; response to calcium ion; ventricular cardiac muscle tissue morphogenesis; actin crosslink formation; muscle filament sliding; regulation of muscle filament sliding speed; cardiac muscle contraction; protein heterooligomerization; skeletal muscle contraction; sarcomere organization |
Sources:Amigo / QuickGO
Orthologs
| Databases | NCBI: entry; OMA: entry |
| Species | Human | Mouse |
| Entrez | 7139 | 21956 |
| Ensembl | ENSG00000118194 | ENSMUSG00000026414 |
| UniProt | P45379 | P50752 |
| RefSeq (mRNA) | NM_000364; NM_001001430; NM_001001431; NM_001001432; NM_001276345 NM_001276346; NM_001276347 | NM_001130174; NM_001130175; NM_001130176; NM_001130177; NM_001130178 NM_001130179; NM_001130180; NM_001130181; NM_011619 |
| RefSeq (protein) | NP_000355; NP_001001430; NP_001001431; NP_001001432; NP_001263274 NP_001263275; NP_001263276 | NP_001123646; NP_001123647; NP_001123648; NP_001123649; NP_001123650 NP_001123651; NP_001123652; NP_001123653; NP_035749 |
| Location (UCSC) | Chr 1: 201.36 – 201.38 Mb | Chr 1: 135.76 – 135.78 Mb |
| PubMed search |
- Wikidata
| View/Edit Human | View/Edit Mouse |

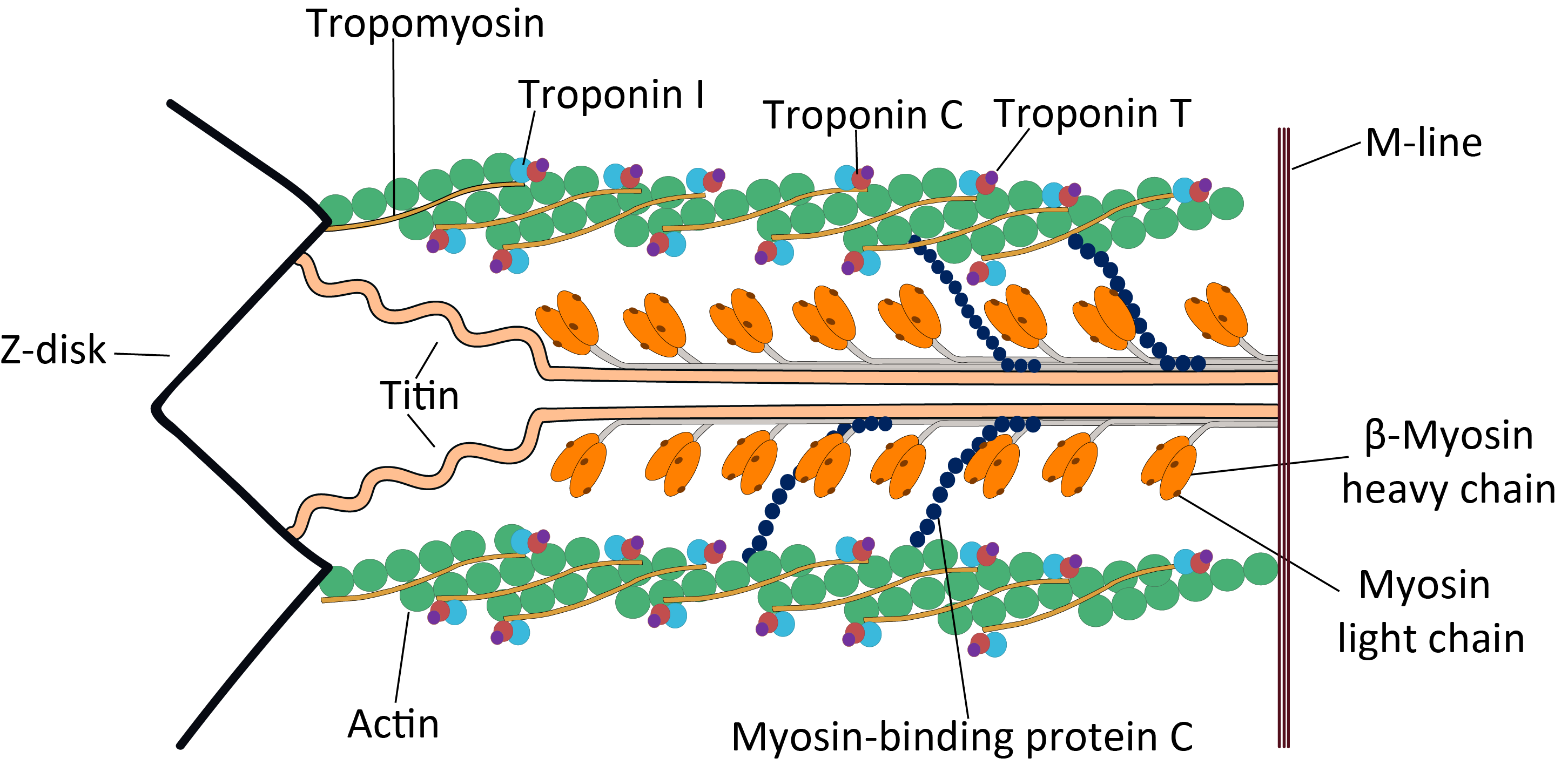
Cardiac sarcomere structure, featuring troponin T

Troponin T, cardiac muscle (TnTc), also Cardiac muscle troponin T is a protein that in humans is encoded by the TNNT2 gene. Cardiac TnT is the tropomyosin-binding subunit of the troponin complex, which is located on the thin filament of striated muscles and regulates muscle contraction in response to alterations in intracellular calcium ion concentration.

The TNNT2 gene is located at 1q32 in the human chromosomal genome, encoding the cardiac muscle isoform of troponin T (cTnT). Human cTnT is an ~36-kDa protein consisting of 297 amino acids including the first methionine with an isoelectric point (pI) of 4.88. It is the tropomyosin- binding and thin filament anchoring subunit of the troponin complex in cardiac muscle cells. TNNT2 gene is expressed in vertebrate cardiac muscles and embryonic skeletal muscles.

== Structure ==
Cardiac TnT is a 35.9 kDa protein composed of 298 amino acids. Cardiac TnT is the largest of the three troponin subunits (cTnT, troponin I (TnI), troponin C (TnC)) on the actin thin filament of cardiac muscle. The structure of TnT is asymmetric; the globular C-terminal domain interacts with tropomyosin (Tm), TnI and TnC, and the N-terminal tether which strongly binds Tm. The N-terminal region of TnT is alternatively spliced, accounting for multiple isoforms observed in cardiac muscle.

== Function ==
As part of the Troponin complex, the function of cTnT is to regulate muscle contraction. The N-terminal region of TnT that strongly binds actin most likely moves with Tm and actin during strong myosin crossbridge binding and force generation. This region is likely involved in the transduction of cooperativity down the thin filament. The C-terminal region of TnT constitutes part of the globular troponin complex domain, and participates in employing the calcium sensitivity of strong myosin crossbridge binding to the thin filament.

== Clinical significance ==
Cardiac troponin T
- Synonyms: "troponin T" (vague)
- Test of: TNNT2 in serum / blood
- LOINC: LP17145-1

Mutations in this gene have been associated with familial hypertrophic cardiomyopathy as well as with restrictive and dilated cardiomyopathy. Transcripts for this gene undergo alternative splicing that results in many tissue-specific isoforms, however, the full-length nature of some of these variants has not yet been determined. Mutations of this gene may be associated with mild or absent hypertrophy and predominant restrictive disease, with a high risk of sudden cardiac death. Advancement to dilated cardiomyopathy may be more rapid in patients with TNNT2 mutations than in those with myosin heavy chain mutations.

In patients with active chronic non-inflammatory myopathy and myositis, skeletal muscles are a significant source of cardiac troponin T without any cardiac involvement. It is advised to measure cardiac troponin I instead if a skeletal muscle disorder is suspected.

=== Reference values ===
The 99th percentile cutoff for cardiac troponin T (cTnT) is 0.01 ng/mL, equivalent to 10 ng/L. The reference range for the high sensitivity cardiac troponin T (hs-cTnT) is a normal < 14 ng/L, borderline of 14-52 ng/L, and elevated of >52 ng/L.

=== Elevated levels after COVID-19 mRNA vaccinations ===
A study carried out by the University of Basel and the University Hospital of Basel found that a COVID-19 mRNA vaccination significantly elevates the cardiac troponin T levels in the blood stream. 3% of the study subjects have shown elevated amounts of the protein after their 3rd vaccination. The effect was most pronounced among young men. It is not yet clear what the mechanism is, and the observed troponin levels were still much lower than in clinically significant heart disease. Given that previous studies only registered 35 cases of heart muscle inflammation per million subjects, the involved researchers were surprised by the results.

== Evolution ==
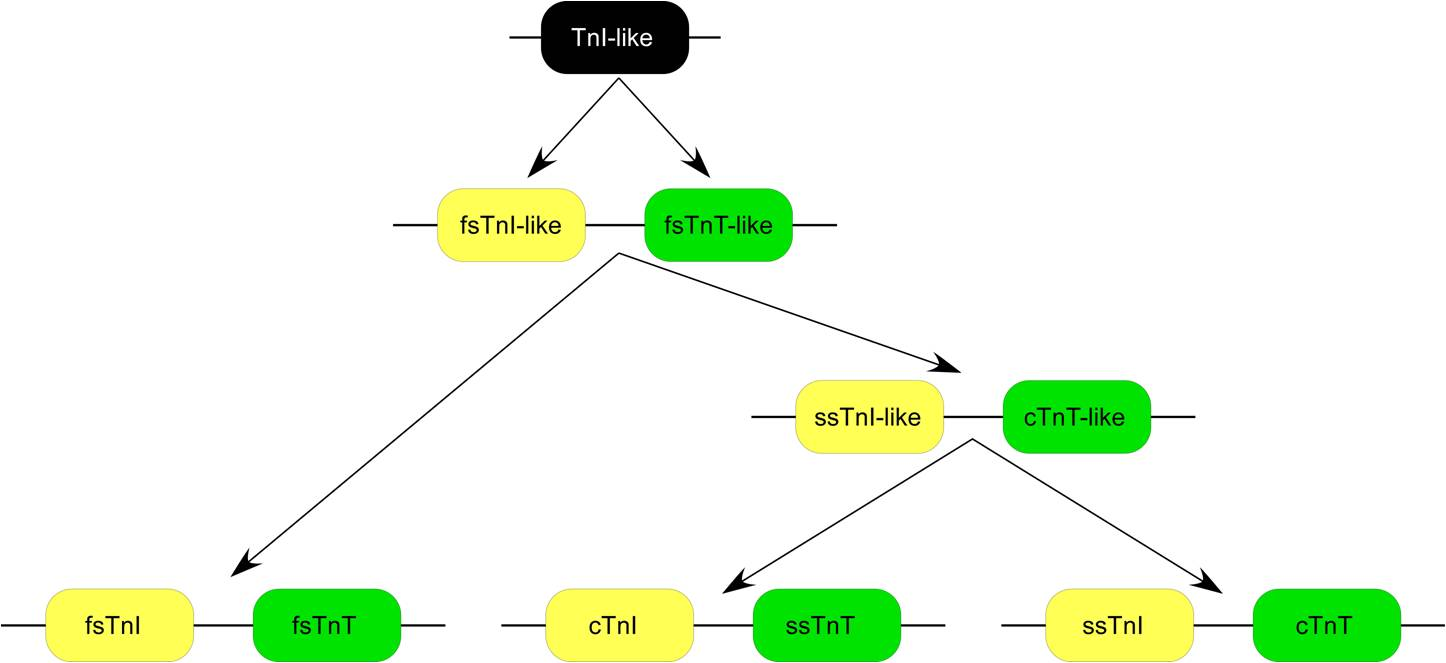

Three homologous genes have evolved in vertebrates encoding three muscle type- specific isoforms of TnT. Each of the TnT isoform genes is linked in chromosomal DNA to a troponin I (TnI) isoform gene encoding the inhibitory subunit of the troponin complex to form three gene pairs: The fast skeletal muscle TnI (fsTnI)-fsTnT, slow skeletal muscle TnI (ssTnI)-cTnT, and cTnI-ssTnT pairs. Sequence and epitope conservation studies suggested that genes encoding the muscle type-specific TnT and TnI isoforms have originated from a TnI-like ancestor gene and duplicated and diversified from a fsTnI-like-fsTnT-like gene pair.

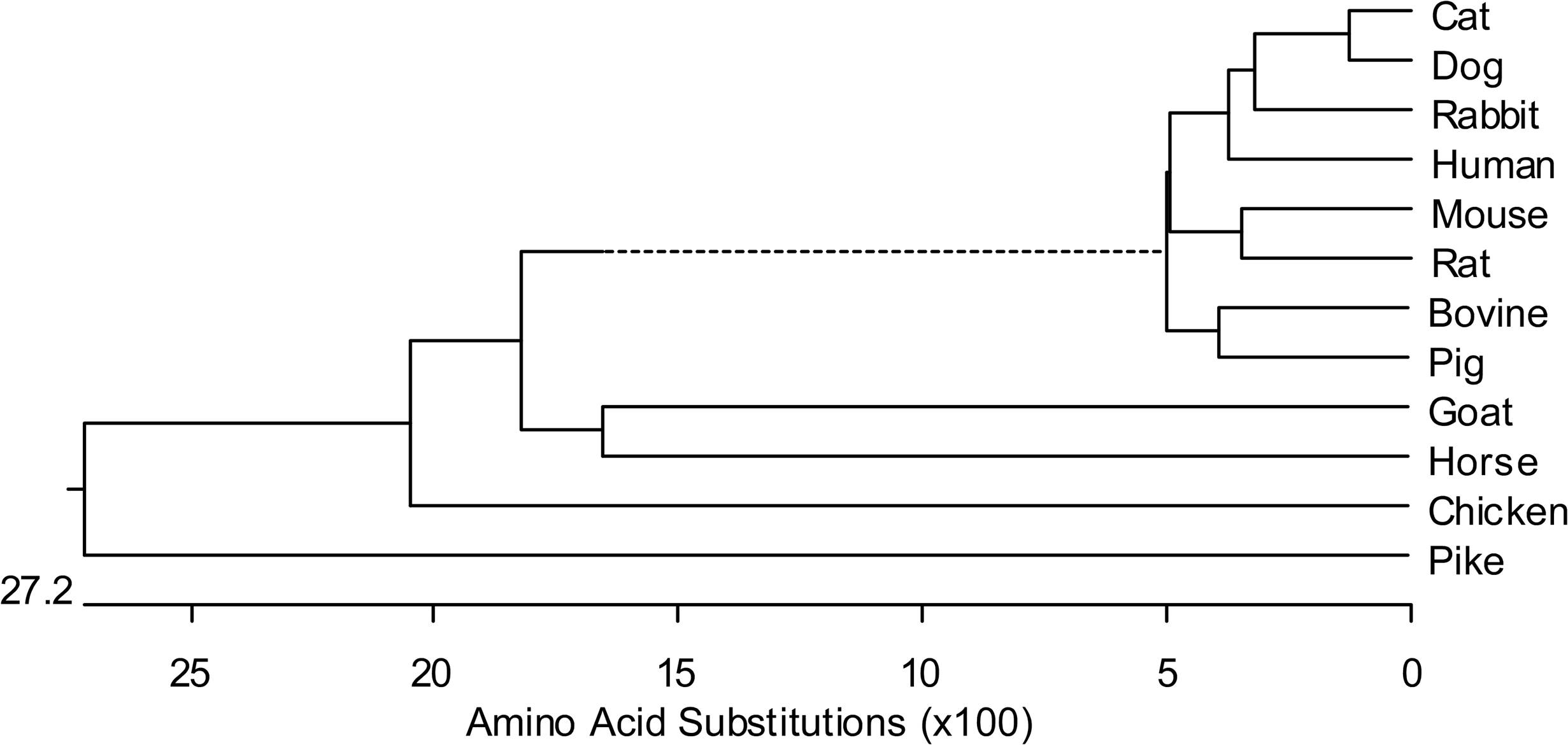

The apparently scrambled linkage between ssTnI-cTnT and cTnI-ssTnT genes actually reflects original functional linkages as that TNNT2 gene is expressed together with ssTnI gene in embryonic cardiac muscle. Protein sequence alignment demonstrated that TNNT2 gene is conserved in vertebrate species (Fig. 2) in the middle and C-terminal regions, while the three muscle type isoforms are significantly diverged.

== Alternative splicing ==
Mammalian TNNT2 gene contains 14 constitutive exons and 3 alternatively spliced exons. Exons 4 and 5 encoding the N-terminal variable region and exon 13 between the middle and C-terminal regions are alternatively spliced. Exon 5 encodes a 9 or 10 amino acid segment that is highly acidic and negatively charged at physiological pH. Exon 5 is expressed in embryonic heart, down-regulated and ceases express during postnatal development.

Embryonic cTnT with more negative charge at the N-terminal region exerts higher calcium sensitivity of actomyosin ATPase activity and myofilament force production, compared with the adult cardiac TnT, as well as a higher tolerance to acidosis.

TNNT2 gene is transiently expressed in embryonic and neonatal skeletal muscles in both avian and mammalian organisms. When TNNT2 is expressed in neonatal skeletal muscle, the alternative splicing of exon 5 exhibits a synchronized regulation to that in the heart in a species-specific manner. This phenomenon indicates that alternative splicing of TNNT2 pre-mRNA is under the control of a genetically built- in systemic biological clock.

== Posttranslational modifications ==
=== Phosphorylation ===
Ser2 of cTnT at the N terminus is constitutively phosphorylated by unknown mechanisms. cTnT has been found to be phosphorylated by PKC at Thr197, Ser201, Thr206, Ser208 and Thr287 in the C-terminal region. Phosphorylation of Thr206 alone was sufficient to reduce myofilament calcium sensitivity and force production. cTnT is also phosphorylated at Thr194 and Ser198 under stress conditions, leading to attenuated cardiomyocyte contractility. Phosphorylation of cTnT at Ser278 and Thr287 by ROCK-II was shown to decrease myosin ATPase activity and myofilament force development in skinned cardiac muscle. Table 1 summarizes the phosphorylation modifications of cTnT and possible functions.

=== O-linked GlcNAcylation ===
cTnT is increasingly modified at Ser190 by O-GlcNAcylation during the development of heart failure in rat, accompanied by decreased phosphorylation of Ser208.

=== Proteolytic modification ===
In apoptotic cardiomyocytes, cTnT was cleaved by caspase 3 to generate a 25-kDa N-terminal truncated fragment. This destructive fragmentation removes a part of the middle region tropomyosin binding site 1, leading to attenuation of the myofilament force production by decreasing the myosin ATPase activity.

In cardiac muscle under stress conditions, cardiac TnT is cleaved by calpain I, restrictively removing the entire N-terminal variable region. This proteolytic modification of cTnT occurs in cardiac muscle in acute ischemia-reperfusion or pressure overload.

The restrictively N-terminal truncated cTnT remains functional in the myofilaments and leads to reduced contractile velocity of the ventricular muscle, which extends the rapid ejection phase and results in an increase in stroke volume, especially under increased afterload. In vitro studies showed that N-terminal truncated cTnT preserved the overall cardiac myofilament calcium sensitivity and cooperativity, but altered TnT's binding affinities for tropomyosin, TnI and TnC proteins, and lead to slightly decreased maximum myosin ATPase activity and myofilament force production, which forms the basis of the selective decrease in contractile velocity of ventricular muscle to increase stroke volume without significant increase in energy expenditure.

With the relatively short half-life of cTnT in cardiomyocytes (3–4 days), the N-terminal truncated cTnT would be replaced by newly synthesized intact cTnT in several days. Therefore, this mechanism provides a reversible posttranslational regulation to modulate cardiac function in adaptation to stress conditions.

Phosphorylation sites in cTnT in comparison with ssTnT and fsTnT
| Phosphorylation site | | | Kinase | Function | Reference |
| cTnT | ssTnT | fsTnT | Kinase | Function | Reference |
|---|---|---|---|---|---|
| Ser_{2} | c | c | PKC | Unknown | |
| Thr_{197} | n | N | PKC | No functional effect | |
| Ser_{201} | n | n | PKC | No functional effect | |
| Thr_{204} | n | n | PKC | Reduce Myosin ATPase activity, myofilament force production and Ca^{2+} sensitivity | |
| Thr_{204} | n | n | CaMK II | Unknown | |
| Thr_{204} | n | n | ASK I | Reduce cardiomyocyte contractility | |
| Thr_{206} | | | PKC | Reduce Ca^{2+} sensitivity, actomyosin ATPase activity and tension development | |
| Ser_{208} | n | n | PKC | Reduce Myosin ATPase activity, alter myofilament Ca^{2+} sensitivity | |
| Ser_{208} | n | n | ASK I | Reduce cardiomyocyte contractility | |
| Thr_{213} | c | c | PKC | Reduce Myosin ATPase activity, myofilament force production and Ca^{2+} sensitivity | |
| Thr_{213} | c | c | Raf-1 | Unknown | |
| Ser_{285} | n | c | PKC | Reduce Myosin ATPase activity, myofilament force production and Ca^{2+} sensitivity | |
| Ser_{285} | n | c | ROCK-II | Reduce myofilament force development, Myosin ATPase activity and Ca^{2+} sensitivity | |
| Thr_{294} | n | n | PKC | Reduce Myosin ATPase activity, myofilament force production and Ca^{2+} sensitivity | |
| Thr_{294} | n | n | ROCK-II | Reduce myofilament force development, myosin ATPase activity and Ca^{2+} sensitivity | |

The residues in cardiac TnT with phosphorylation regulations are summarized. The residue numbers for phosphorylatable serine and threonine are that in human cardiac TnT with the first methionine included. The phosphorylation of cardiac TnT at these residues is compared with the counterparts in fast TnT and slow TnT. C, conserved; N, non-conserved. Kinases responsible for each phosphorylation, functional effects, and references are also listed.

== Mutations in cardiomyopathies ==
Point mutations in TNNT2 gene cause various types of cardiomyopathies, including hypertrophic cardiomyopathy (HCM), dilated cardiomyopathy (DCM) and restrictive cardiomyopathy (RCM). The table below summarizes representative TNNT2 mutations and abnormal splicings found in human and animal cardiomyopathies.

Representative TNNT2 mutations and abnormal splicings that cause cardiomyopathy
| Mutation | Diagnosis | Reference |
|---|---|---|
| Ile79Asn | HCM | |
| Arg92Gln | HCM | |
| Intron 16G1→A (D14 and D28+7) | HCM | |
| Arg92Leu | HCM | |
| Arg92Trp | HCM | |
| Arg94Leu | HCM | |
| Arg94Cys | HCM | |
| ΔE96 | RCM | |
| Ala104Val | HCM | |
| Phe110Ile | DCM | |
| Arg130Cys | HCM | |
| Arg131Trp | DCM | |
| E136K | RCM | |
| Arg141Trp | DCM | |
| DGlu160 | HCM | |
| Glu163Arg | HCM | |
| Glu163Lys | HCM | |
| Ser179Phe | HCM | |
| Arg205Leu | DCM | |
| DLys210 | DCM | |
| Glu244Asp | HCM | |
| Asp270Asn | DCM | |
| Lys273Glu | DCM | |
| Arg278Cys | HCM | |

Amino Acid residues of mutations were numbered as in human cardiac TnT with the first methionine included. Mutations of cardiac TnT that caused cardiomyopathies were mostly found in the conserved middle and C-terminal regions.
