= CAPZB =

Protein-coding gene in humans

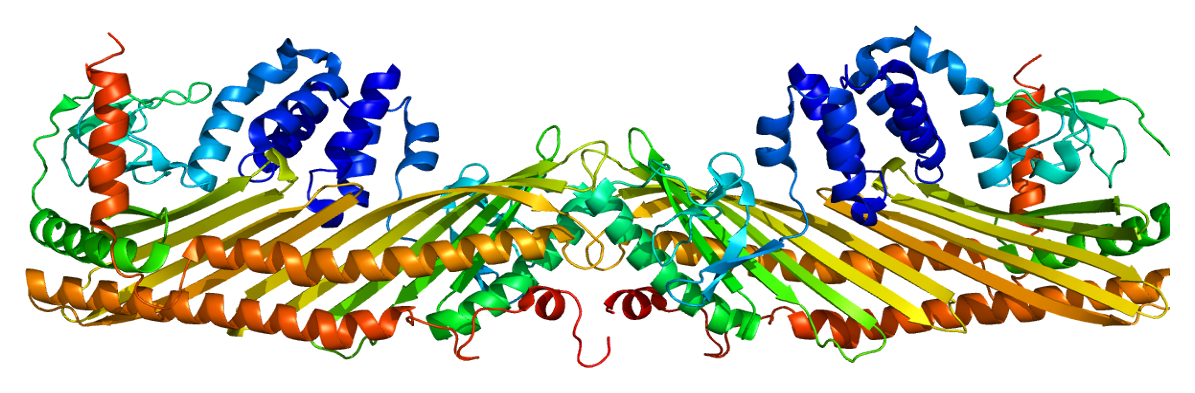

Identifiers
- Aliases: CAPZB, CAPB, CAPPB, CAPZ, capping actin protein of muscle Z-line beta subunit, capping actin protein of muscle Z-line subunit beta
- External IDs: OMIM: 601572; MGI: 104652; GeneCards: CAPZB

Gene location (Human)
Chr.	Chromosome 1 (human)
Band	1p36.13	Start	19,338,775 bp
Band	1p36.13	End	19,485,539 bp

Gene location (Mouse)
Chr.	Chromosome 4 (mouse)
Band	4 D3|4 70.59 cM	Start	138,920,210 bp
Band	4 D3|4 70.59 cM	End	139,019,129 bp
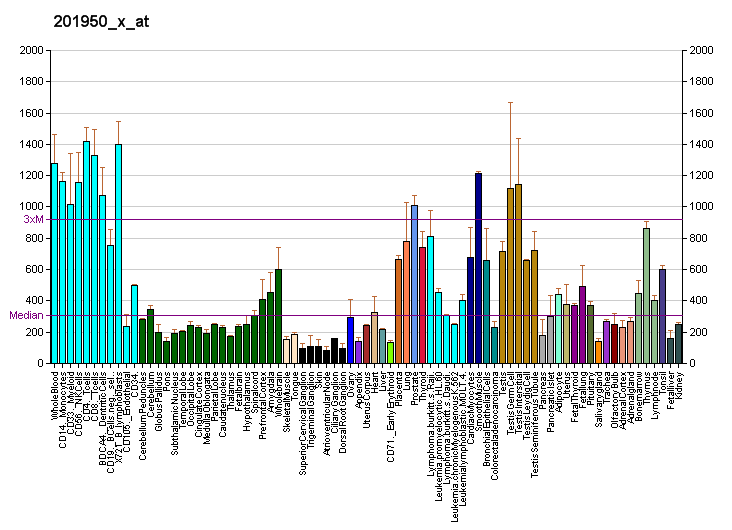

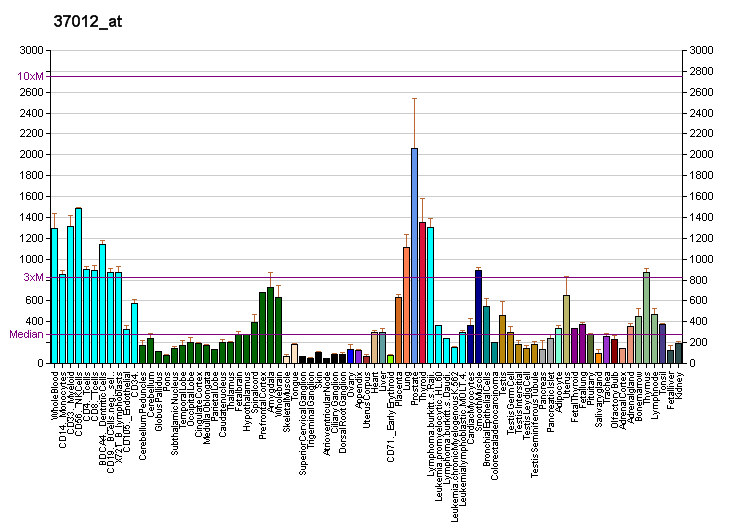

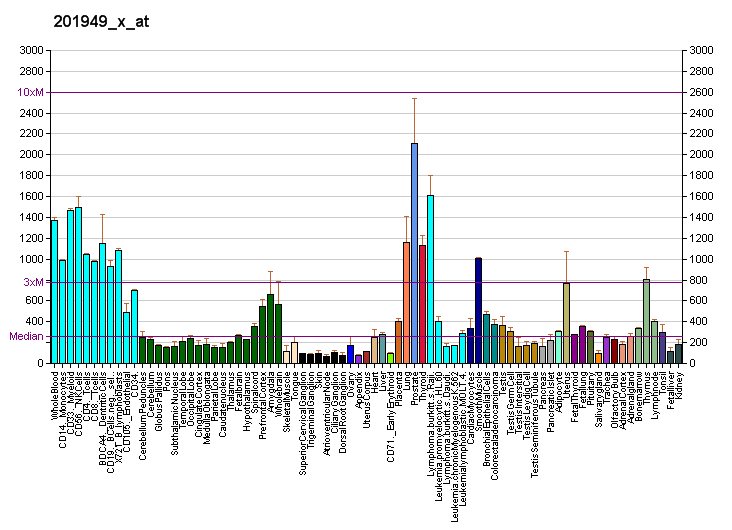
RNA expression pattern
Bgee	Human / Mouse (ortholog); Top expressed in: muscle layer of sigmoid colon; smooth muscle tissue; monocyte; granulocyte; left testis; right testis; stromal cell of endometrium; pylorus; popliteal artery; tibial arteries / Top expressed in: gastrula; granulocyte; triceps brachii muscle; ascending aorta; tibiofemoral joint; ankle; pyloric antrum; yolk sac; tail of embryo; vastus lateralis muscle; More reference expression data
BioGPS	More reference expression data
Gene ontology
Molecular function	actin filament binding; cadherin binding; actin binding; protein binding
Cellular component	cytoplasm; cytosol; sarcomere; WASH complex; extracellular exosome; cytoskeleton; actin filament; actin cytoskeleton; F-actin capping protein complex
Biological process	regulation of lamellipodium assembly; barbed-end actin filament capping; regulation of cell morphogenesis; blood coagulation; cytoskeleton organization; actin cytoskeleton organization; actin filament capping; negative regulation of filopodium assembly; endoplasmic reticulum to Golgi vesicle-mediated transport; antigen processing and presentation of exogenous peptide antigen via MHC class II; cell morphogenesis
Sources:Amigo / QuickGO
Orthologs
Databases	NCBI: entry; OMA: entry
Species	Human	Mouse
Entrez	832	12345
Ensembl	ENSG00000077549	ENSMUSG00000028745
UniProt	P47756	P47757
RefSeq (mRNA)	NM_001313932; NM_001206540; NM_001206541; NM_001282162; NM_004930	NM_001037761; NM_001271405; NM_001271406; NM_009798
RefSeq (protein)	NP_001193469; NP_001193470; NP_001269091; NP_001300861; NP_004921	NP_001032850; NP_001258334; NP_033928
Location (UCSC)	Chr 1: 19.34 – 19.49 Mb	Chr 4: 138.92 – 139.02 Mb
PubMed search
- Wikidata
View/Edit Human	View/Edit Mouse

F-actin-capping protein subunit beta, also known as CapZβ, is a protein that in humans is encoded by the CAPZB gene. CapZβ functions to cap actin filaments at barbed ends in muscle and other tissues.

== Structure ==
CapZβ can exist as 3 unique β subunits, dependent on alternative splicing mechanisms. CapZβ1 is 31.4 kDa and 277 amino acids in length, CapZβ2 is 30.6 kDa and 272 amino acids in length, and CapZβ3 is 301 amino acids in length (N-terminal extension of 29 amino acids relative to the β2 subunit.). In contrast, the 3 α subunits arise from distinct genes. CapZ is a heterodimer composed of an α and β subunit. In muscle, capping protein α1 subunit and β1 subunit are localized at the Z-disc, and form CapZ. CapZ interacts with α-actinin, nebulette, nebulin, HSC70. at the Z-disc.

== Function ==
CAPZB is a member of the F-actin capping protein family. This gene encodes the beta subunit of the barbed-end actin binding protein. The protein regulates growth of the actin filament by capping the barbed end of growing actin filaments.

CapZβ functions to cap actin filaments at barbed (+) ends, thus controlling the rate of G-actin polymerization to F-actin and corresponding filament length. CapZ works in concert with tropomodulin, which caps actin at pointed ends. In muscle, the interaction of CapZ with actin is critical during myofibrilogenesis, as administration of a CapZ monoclonal antibody or expression of CapZ mutant protein disrupts actin filament formation and assembly of myofibrils. Isoforms of the CapZβ (β1 and β2) have distinct functions, as CapZβ1 anchors actin at Z-discs and CapZβ2 at intercalated discs. Overexpression of CapZβ2 (and concomitant down-regulation of CapZβ1) in mice resulted in a diseased phenotype with stunted growth, irregular gait, labored breathing and juvenile lethality. Ultrastructural measurements showed severely disrupted myofibrillar architecture. A function of CapZβ in transducing protein kinase C signaling in cardiac myocytes was illuminated by a study in skinned cardiac fibers which demonstrated that partial, transgenic reduction of CapZβ attenuated the functional effect of protein kinase C on contraction and disturbed normal PKC isoform translocation patterns following phenylephrine or endothelin-1 treatment. A later study showed that partial reduction of CapZβ was cardioprotective during ischemia-reperfusion injury, concomitant with altered PKC isoform translocation to myofilaments. Regarding the turnover of CapZβ, it was recently demonstrated that the protein turnover of CapZβ1 is in part regulated by the Bcl-2–associated athanogene, BAG3, through a mechanism involving the association between HSC70 and CapZβ1.

== Clinical Significance ==
There is currently little to no data available on the relationship between the CAPZB gene and human disease.
