= DIPK2A =

Protein-coding gene in the species Homo sapiens

Identifiers
- Aliases: DIPK2A, DIA1, GoPro49, HASF, chromosome 3 open reading frame 58, C3orf58, divergent protein kinase domain 2A
- External IDs: OMIM: 612200; MGI: 1916111; GeneCards: DIPK2A

Gene location (Human)
Chr.	Chromosome 3 (human)
Band	3q24	Start	143,971,823 bp
Band	3q24	End	144,048,719 bp

Gene location (Mouse)
Chr.	Chromosome 9 (mouse)
Band	9|9 E3.3	Start	94,399,917 bp
Band	9|9 E3.3	End	94,420,134 bp
RNA expression pattern
Bgee	Human / Mouse (ortholog); Top expressed in: cerebellar vermis; tibia; mucosa of paranasal sinus; skin of arm; skin of thigh; endothelial cell; corpus callosum; skin of hip; germinal epithelium; human penis / Top expressed in: lobe of cerebellum; cerebellar vermis; dental follicle; vestibular membrane of cochlear duct; secondary oocyte; atrium; lateral septal nucleus; skin of external ear; median eminence; lens; More reference expression data
BioGPS	n/a
Orthologs
Databases	NCBI: entry; OMA: entry
Species	Human	Mouse
Entrez	205428	68861
Ensembl	ENSG00000181744	ENSMUSG00000045414
UniProt	Q8NDZ4	Q3USZ8
RefSeq (mRNA)	NM_001134470; NM_173552; NM_001363944	NM_001033145
RefSeq (protein)	NP_001127942; NP_775823; NP_001350873	NP_001028317
Location (UCSC)	Chr 3: 143.97 – 144.05 Mb	Chr 9: 94.4 – 94.42 Mb
PubMed search
- Wikidata
View/Edit Human	View/Edit Mouse

chromosome 3 open reading frame 58

Identifiers
- Symbol: C3orf58
- NCBI gene: 205428
- HGNC: 28490
- RefSeq: NM_173552

Other data
- Locus: Chr. 3 q24

Divergent protein kinase domain 2A is a protein encoded in humans by the DIPK2A gene. It was highlighted in a screen for genes possibly related to autism. The authors propose that the gene should be renamed Deleted in autism-1 (DIA1). Experiments in a rat neuronal cell culture model suggested that this gene may be regulated directly or indirectly by MEF2 site binding proteins.

== See also ==
- Heritability of autism
