= F-actin capping protein =

F-actin capping protein alpha subunit
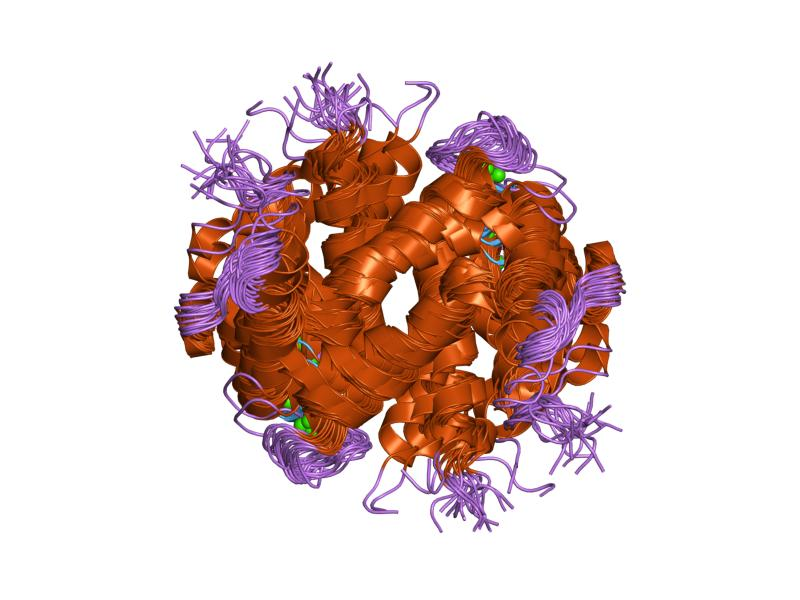
- solution nmr structure of s100b bound to the high-affinity target peptide trtk-12

Identifiers
- Symbol: F-actin_cap_A
- Pfam: PF01267
- InterPro: IPR018315
- PROSITE: PDOC00609
- SCOP2: 1izn / SCOPe / SUPFAM
Available protein structures:
- PDB: IPR018315 PF01267 (ECOD; PDBsum)
- AlphaFold: IPR018315; PF01267

F-actin capping protein, beta subunit

Identifiers
- Symbol: F_actin_cap_B
- Pfam: PF01115
- InterPro: IPR001698
- PROSITE: PDOC00203
- SCOP2: 1izn / SCOPe / SUPFAM
Available protein structures:
- PDB: IPR001698 PF01115 (ECOD; PDBsum)
- AlphaFold: IPR001698; PF01115

In molecular biology, the F-actin capping protein is a protein complex which binds in a calcium-independent manner to the fast-growing ends of actin filaments (barbed end), thereby blocking the exchange of subunits at these ends. Unlike gelsolin and severin this protein does not sever actin filaments. The F-actin capping protein is a heterodimer composed of two unrelated subunits: alpha and beta. Neither of the subunits shows sequence similarity to other filament-capping proteins. The alpha subunit is a protein of about 268 to 286 amino acid residues and the beta subunit is approximately 280 amino acids, their sequences are well conserved in eukaryotic species.

The actin filament system, a prominent part of the cytoskeleton in eukaryotic cells, is both a static structure and a dynamic network that can undergo rearrangements: it is thought to be involved in processes such as cell movement and phagocytosis, as well as muscle contraction.
