= Actin, alpha skeletal muscle =

Protein found in humans

ACTA1
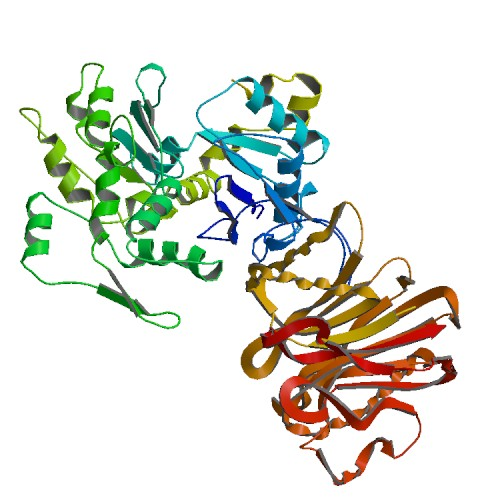

Identifiers
- Aliases: ACTA1, ACTA, ASMA, CFTD, CFTD1, CFTDM, MPFD, NEM1, NEM2, NEM3, Actin, alpha 1, SHPM, actin, alpha 1, skeletal muscle, actin alpha 1, skeletal muscle
- External IDs: OMIM: 102610; MGI: 87902; GeneCards: ACTA1
Available structures
PDB	Ortholog search: PDBe RCSB
PDB	List of PDB id codes 1T44

Gene location (Human)
Chr.	Chromosome 1 (human)
Band	1q42.13	Start	229,430,365 bp
Band	1q42.13	End	229,434,104 bp

Gene location (Mouse)
Chr.	Chromosome 8 (mouse)
Band	8 E2|8 72.26 cM	Start	124,618,508 bp
Band	8 E2|8 72.26 cM	End	124,621,490 bp
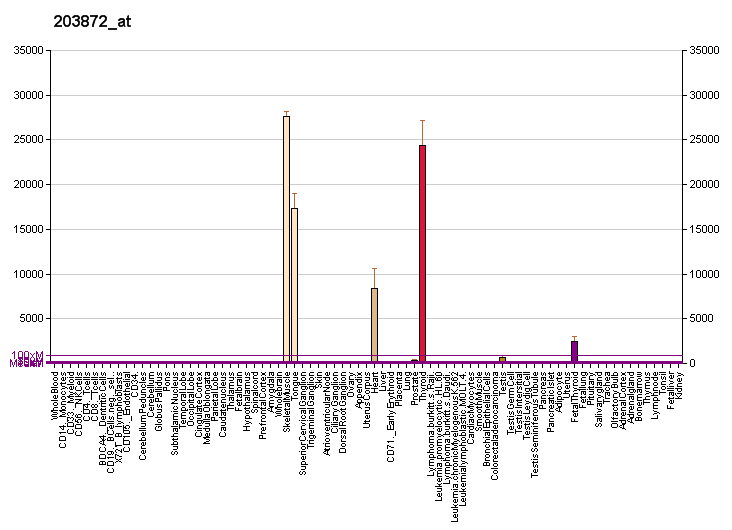
RNA expression pattern
Bgee	Human / Mouse (ortholog); Top expressed in: Skeletal muscle tissue of biceps brachii; glutes; triceps brachii muscle; Skeletal muscle tissue of rectus abdominis; thoracic diaphragm; tibialis anterior muscle; muscle of thigh; gastrocnemius muscle; body of tongue; deltoid muscle / Top expressed in: ankle; soleus muscle; plantaris muscle; medial head of gastrocnemius muscle; intercostal muscle; muscle of thigh; body of femur; digastric muscle; temporal muscle; vastus lateralis muscle; More reference expression data
BioGPS	More reference expression data
Gene ontology
Molecular function	nucleotide binding; myosin binding; ADP binding; structural constituent of cytoskeleton; protein binding; ATP binding
Cellular component	cytoplasm; cell body; cytosol; blood microparticle; filopodium; sarcomere; striated muscle thin filament; stress fiber; extracellular fluid; actin filament; actin cytoskeleton; extracellular exosome; cytoskeleton; lamellipodium
Biological process	muscle contraction; response to steroid hormone; skeletal muscle fiber adaptation; response to mechanical stimulus; skeletal muscle thin filament assembly; response to lithium ion; cell growth; positive regulation of gene expression; muscle filament sliding; mesenchyme migration; response to extracellular stimulus; skeletal muscle fiber development
Sources:Amigo / QuickGO
Orthologs
Databases	NCBI: entry; OMA: entry
Species	Human	Mouse
Entrez	58	11459
Ensembl	ENSG00000143632	ENSMUSG00000031972
UniProt	P68133	P68134
RefSeq (mRNA)	NM_001100	NM_001272041; NM_009606
RefSeq (protein)	NP_001091	NP_001258970; NP_033736
Location (UCSC)	Chr 1: 229.43 – 229.43 Mb	Chr 8: 124.62 – 124.62 Mb
PubMed search
- Wikidata
View/Edit Human	View/Edit Mouse

Actin, alpha skeletal muscle is a protein that in humans is encoded by the ACTA1 gene.

Actin alpha 1 which is expressed in skeletal muscle is one of six different actin isoforms which have been identified. Actins are highly conserved proteins that are involved in cell motility, structure and integrity. Alpha actins are a major constituent of the contractile apparatus.

== Skeletal actin gene expression ==
Skeletal alpha actin expression is induced by stimuli and conditions known to cause muscle formation. Such conditions result in fusion of committed cells (satellite cells) into myotubes, to form muscle fibers. Skeletal actin itself, when expressed, causes expression of several other "myogenic genes", which are essential to muscle formation. One key transcription factor that activates skeletal actin gene expression is Serum Response Factor ("SRF"), a protein that binds to specific sites on the promoter DNA of the actin gene. SRF may bring a number of other proteins to the promoter of skeletal actin, such as androgen receptor, and thereby contribute to induction of skeletal actin gene expression by androgenic (often termed "anabolic") steroids.

== Interactions ==
Actin, alpha 1 has been shown to interact with TMSB4X, MIB2 and PRKCE.

== Clinical significance ==
Mutations in the ACTA1 gene are known to cause the following conditions:

- Nemaline myopathy 3 (NEM3);
- Myopathy, actin, congenital, with excess of thin myofilaments (MPCETM);
- Myopathy, congenital, with fiber-type disproportion (CFTD);
- Myopathy, scapulohumeroperoneal (SHPM).

== See also ==
- Actin
- ACTB
