= Troponin I, cardiac muscle =

Protein-coding gene in the species Homo sapiens

TNNI3
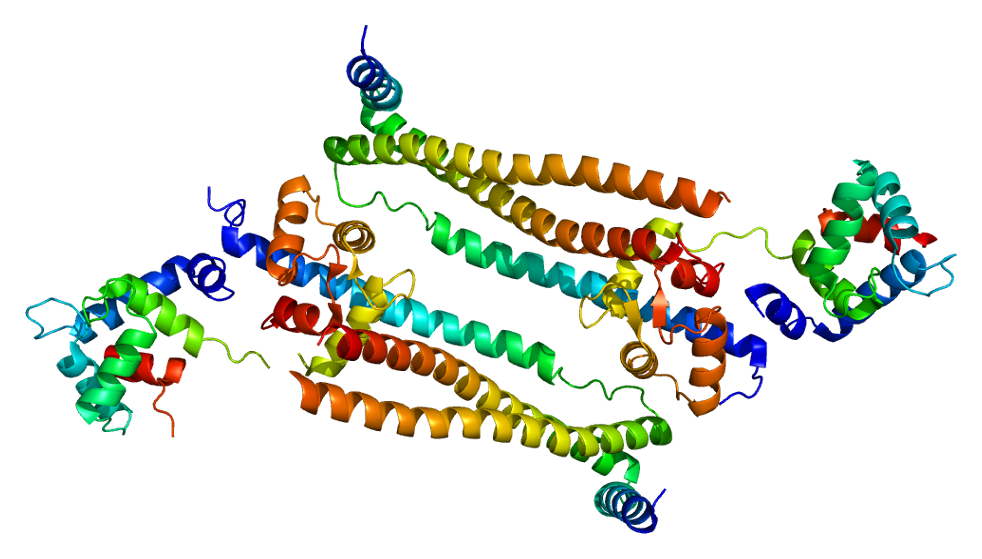

Identifiers
- Aliases: TNNI3, CMD1FF, CMD2A, CMH7, RCM1, TNNC1, cTnI, troponin I3, cardiac type, cardiac troponin I
- External IDs: OMIM: 191044; MGI: 98783; GeneCards: TNNI3
Available structures
PDB	Ortholog search: PDBe RCSB
PDB	List of PDB id codes 1J1D, 1J1E, 1LXF, 1MXL, 1OZS, 2KGB, 2KRD, 2L1R, 2MZP, 4Y99

Gene location (Human)
Chr.	Chromosome 19 (human)
Band	19q13.42	Start	55,151,767 bp
Band	19q13.42	End	55,157,773 bp

Gene location (Mouse)
Chr.	Chromosome 7 (mouse)
Band	7 A1|7 2.61 cM	Start	4,521,304 bp
Band	7 A1|7 2.61 cM	End	4,527,228 bp
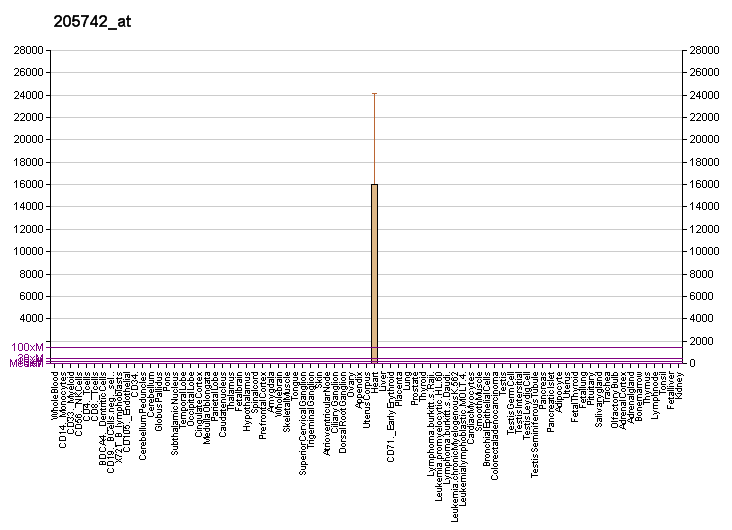
RNA expression pattern
Bgee	Human / Mouse (ortholog); Top expressed in: apex of heart; myocardium of left ventricle; right auricle of heart; right ventricle; cardiac muscle tissue of right atrium; vena cava; right uterine tube; gonad; testicle; muscle of thigh / Top expressed in: myocardium; cardiac muscle tissue of left ventricle; right ventricle; interventricular septum; atrium; atrioventricular valve; aortic valve; endocardial cushion; epithelium of stomach; pyloric antrum; More reference expression data
BioGPS	More reference expression data
Gene ontology
Molecular function	protein kinase binding; protein binding; troponin T binding; calcium-dependent protein binding; calcium channel inhibitor activity; protein domain specific binding; troponin C binding; actin binding; metal ion binding; actin filament binding
Cellular component	troponin complex; sarcomere; cytosol; cytoplasm; contractile fiber; myofibril; cardiac myofibril; cardiac Troponin complex
Biological process	ventricular cardiac muscle tissue morphogenesis; negative regulation of ATP-dependent activity; vasculogenesis; cardiac muscle contraction; regulation of muscle contraction; development of the heart; muscle filament sliding; heart contraction; regulation of smooth muscle contraction; striated muscle contraction; regulation of systemic arterial blood pressure by ischemic conditions; cellular calcium ion homeostasis; skeletal muscle contraction; regulation of cardiac muscle contraction by calcium ion signaling; muscle contraction
Sources:Amigo / QuickGO
Orthologs
Databases	NCBI: entry; OMA: entry
Species	Human	Mouse
Entrez	7137	21954
Ensembl	ENSG00000129991	ENSMUSG00000035458
UniProt	P19429; Q6FGX2	P48787
RefSeq (mRNA)	NM_000363	NM_009406
RefSeq (protein)	NP_000354; NP_000354.4	NP_033432
Location (UCSC)	Chr 19: 55.15 – 55.16 Mb	Chr 7: 4.52 – 4.53 Mb
PubMed search
- Wikidata
View/Edit Human	View/Edit Mouse

Troponin I, cardiac muscle, or cardiac troponin I, is a protein that in humans is encoded by the TNNI3 gene. It is a tissue-specific subtype of troponin I, which in turn is a part of the troponin complex.

The TNNI3 gene encoding cardiac troponin I (cTnI) is located at 19q13.4 in the human chromosomal genome. Human cTnI is a 24 kDa protein consisting of 210 amino acids with isoelectric point (pI) of 9.87. cTnI is exclusively expressed in adult cardiac muscle.

== Gene evolution ==
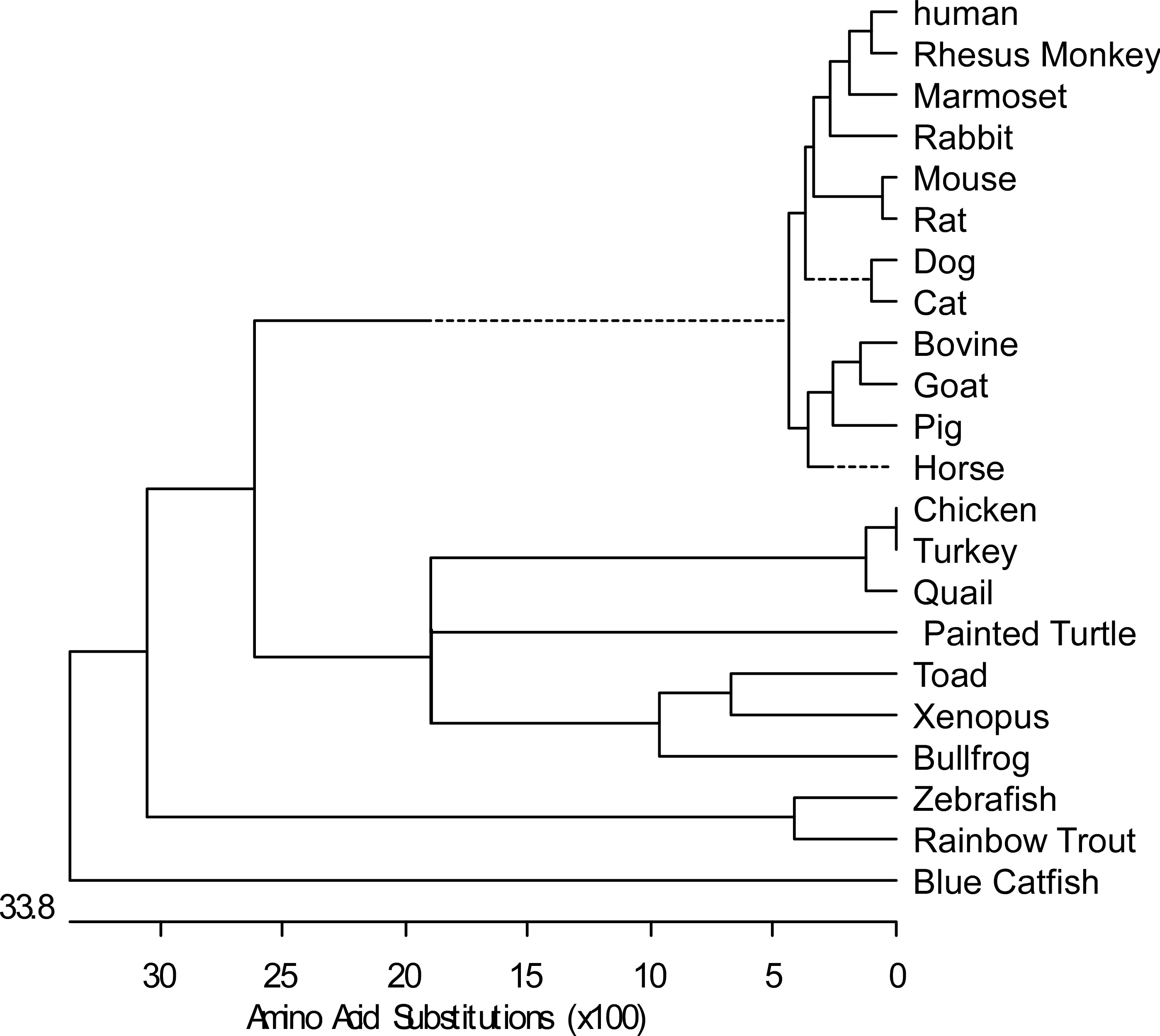
Figure 1: A phylogenetic tree is derived from alignment of amino acid sequences.

cTnI has diverged from the skeletal muscle isoforms of TnI (slow TnI and fast TnI) mainly with a unique N-terminal extension. The amino acid sequence of cTnI is strongly conserved among mammalian species (Fig. 1). On the other hand, the N-terminal extension of cTnI has significantly different structures among mammal, amphibian and fish.

== Tissue distribution ==
TNNI3 is expressed as a heart specific gene. Early embryonic heart expresses solely slow skeletal muscle TnI. cTnI begins to express in mouse heart at approximately embryonic day 10, and the level gradually increases to one-half of the total amount of TnI in the cardiac muscle at birth. cTnI completely replaces slow TnI in the mouse heart approximately 14 days after birth

== Protein structure ==
Based on in vitrostructure-function relationship studies, the structure of cTnI can be divided into six functional segments: a) a cardiac-specific N-terminal extension (residue 1–30) that is not present in fast TnI and slow TnI; b) an N-terminal region (residue 42–79) that binds the C domain of TnC; c) a TnT-binding region (residue 80–136); d) the inhibitory peptide (residue 128–147) that interacts with TnC and actin–tropomyosin; e) the switch or triggering region (residue 148–163) that binds the N domain of TnC; and f) the C-terminal mobile domain (residue 164–210) that binds actin–tropomyosin and is the most conserved segment highly similar among isoforms and across species. Partially crystal structure of human troponin has been determined.

=== Posttranslational modifications ===
Phosphorylation
cTnI was the first sarcomeric protein identified to be a substrate of PKA. Phosphorylation of cTnI at Ser_{23}/Ser_{24} under adrenergic stimulation enhances relaxation of cardiac muscle, which is critical to cardiac function especially at fast heart rate. Whereas PKA phosphorylation of Ser_{23}/Ser_{24} decreases myofilament Ca^{2+} sensitivity and increases relaxation, phosphorylation of Ser_{42}/Ser_{44} by PKC increases Ca^{2+} sensitivity and decreases cardiac muscle relaxation. Ser_{5}/Ser_{6}, Tyr_{26}, Thr_{31}, Ser_{39}, Thr_{51}, Ser_{77}, Thr_{78}, Thr_{129}, Thr_{143} and Ser_{150} are also phosphorylation sites in human cTnI.
cTnI differs from other troponins due to its N-terminal extension of 26 amino acids. This extension contains two serines, residues 23 and 24, which are phosphorylated by protein kinase A in response to beta-adrenergic stimulation and important in increasing the inotropic response (increasing contractility). This is possible, because this modification decreases in the sensitivity to calcium, which in turn decreases the twitch and relaxation time. This, taken together with the fact that this stimuli often appears in during stress, makes serine 23 and 24 phosphorylation associated with the 'fight or flight' response. Furthermore, the importance of modification is visible in serine 22 and 23, whose phosphorylation will impact the functions of the switch peptide with (modulate its interactions with cTnC). This data highlights the importance of cTnI phosphorylation not only in the context of regulating interactions with other cellular components, but also plays a role in the structural interactions within the cTnI itself.
Phosphorylation of cTnI changes the conformation of the protein and modifies its interaction with other troponins as well as the interaction with anti-TnI antibodies. These changes alter the myofilament response to calcium, and are of interest in targeting heart failure. Multiple reaction monitoring of human cTnI has revealed that there are 14 phosphorylation sites and the pattern of phosphorylation observed at these sites is changed in response to disease. cTnI has been shown to be phosphorylated by protein kinase A, protein kinase C, protein kinase G, and p21-activated kinase 3.
A significant part of cTnI released into the patient's bloodstream is phosphorylated.
O-linked GlcNAc modification
Studies on isolated cardiomyocytes found increased levels of O-GlcNAcylation of cardiac proteins in hearts with diabetic dysfunction. Mass spectrometry identified Ser_{150} of mouse cTnI as an O-GlcNAcylation site, suggesting a potential role in regulating myocardial contractility.
C-terminal truncation
The C-terminal end segment is the most conserved region of TnI. As an allosteric structure regulated by Ca^{2+} in the troponin complex, it binds and stabilizes the position of tropomyosin in low Ca^{2+} state implicating a role in the inhibition of actomyosin ATPase. A deletion of the C-terminal 19 amino acids was found during myocardial ischemia-reperfusion injury in Langendorff perfused rat hearts. It was also seen in myocardial stunning in coronary bypass patients. Over-expression of the C-terminal truncated cardiac TnI (cTnI_{1-192}) in transgenic mouse heart resulted in a phenotype of myocardial stunning with systolic and diastolic dysfunctions. Replacement of intact cTnI with cTnT_{1-192} in myofibrils and cardiomyocytes did not affect maximal tension development but decreased the rates of force redevelopment and relaxation.
Restrictive N-terminal truncation
The approximately 30 amino acids N-terminal extension of cTnI is an adult heart-specific structure. The N-terminal extension contains the PKA phosphorylation sites Ser_{23}/Ser_{24} and plays a role in modulating the overall molecular conformation and function of cTnI. A restrictive N-terminal truncation of cTnI occurs at low levels in normal hearts of all vertebrate species examined including human and significantly increases in adaptation to hemodynamic stress and G_{s}α deficiency-caused failing mouse hearts. Distinct from the harmful C-terminal truncation, the restrictive N-terminal truncation of cTnI selectively removing the adult heart specific extension forms a regulatory mechanism in cardiac adaptation to physiological and pathological stress conditions.

== Pathologic mutations ==
Multiple mutations in cTnI have been found to cause cardiomyopathies. cTnI mutations account for approximately 5% of familial hypertrophic cardiomyopathy cases and to date, more than 20 myopathic mutations of cTnI have been characterized.

== Clinical implications ==
Cardiac troponin I
- Synonyms: "troponin I" (vague)
- Test of: TNNI3 in serum / blood
- LOINC: 10839-9

The half-life of cTnI in adult cardiomyocytes is estimated to be ~3.2 days and there is a pool of unassembled cardiac TnI in the cytoplasm. Cardiac TnI is exclusively expressed in the myocardium and is thus a highly specific diagnostic marker for cardiac muscle injuries, and cTnI has been universally used as indicator for myocardial infarction. An increased level of serum cTnI also independently predicts poor prognosis of critically ill patients in the absence of acute coronary syndrome.

For more than 15 years cTnI has been known as a reliable marker of cardiac muscle tissue injury. It is considered to be more sensitive and significantly more specific in the diagnosis of myocardial infarction than the "golden marker" of the last decades – CK-MB, as well as total creatine kinase, myoglobin and lactate dehydrogenase isoenzymes. Troponin I is not entirely specific for myocardial damage secondary to infarction. Other causes of raised troponin I include chronic kidney failure, heart failure, subarachnoid haemorrhage and pulmonary embolus.

In veterinary medicine, increased cTnI has been noted from myocardial damage after ionophore toxicity in cattle.

=== High-sensitivity troponin I testing ===
The high sensitive troponin I (hs-cTnI) test is a chemiluminescence microparticle immunoassay, which is used to quantitatively determine cardiac troponin I in human plasma and serum. The test can be used to aid in diagnosing myocardial infarction, as a prognostic marker in patients with acute coronary syndrome and to identify the risk (low, moderate and elevated) of future cardiovascular diseases such as myocardial infarction, heart failure, ischaemic stroke, coronary revascularization, and cardiovascular death in asymptomatic people.

High sensitive troponin I has been proven to have superior clinical performance versus high sensitivity troponin T in patients with renal impairment and skeletal muscle disease. It is also not affected by diurnal rhythm, which is important when the test is used as a screening tool for CVD.

==== Prognostic use ====
The basis for the modern prevention of CVD lies in the prognosis of the risk of the development of myocardial infarction, stroke or heart failure in the future. Currently, most prognostic models of cardiovascular risk (European SCORE scale, Framingham scale, etc.) are based on the evaluation of traditional risk factors of CVD. This stratification system is indirect and has several limitations, which include the inaccurate forecasting of risks. These risk scales are heavily dependent on the age of the person. Research data bears evidence that the high sensitive troponin I test enables higher precision in determining the cardiovascular risk group of the individual, if used together with the results of clinical and diagnostic examinations.

- High sensitive troponin I test can help to proactively identify individuals at high cardiovascular risk long before symptoms appear. The higher the troponin I level in asymptomatic individuals, the higher the likelihood of subclinical myocardial injury.
- It provides greater accuracy in identifying persons at low CVD risk.
- Troponin I is a biomarker that responds to treatment interventions. Reductions in troponin I levels proved to reduce the risk of future CVD.
- High sensitive troponin I used as a screening tool to assess a person's cardiovascular risk and has the potential to reduce the growing cost burden of the healthcare system.

The efficiency of the new test has been confirmed by data collected by international studies with the participation of more than 100,000 subjects.

The ability of high sensitive troponin I to identify individual's cardiovascular risk in asymptomatic people enables physicians to use it in outpatient/ambulatory practice during preventive check-ups, complex health examinations, or examinations of patients with known risk factors. Knowing which cardiovascular risk group a person belongs to allows physicians to promptly determine patient care tactics well before the development of symptoms, and to prevent adverse outcomes.

==== Indications for testing ====
High sensitive troponin I test is recommended for asymptomatic women and men to assess and stratify their cardiovascular risk.

Individuals may or may not have known established cardiovascular risk factors:

1. high blood pressure;
2. obesity;
3. congenital factors, history of cardiovascular diseases;
4. pre-diabetes, diabetes;
5. sedentary lifestyle;
6. metabolic syndrome;
7. dislipidaemia;
8. smoking.

Incorporating the high sensitive troponin I test into initial screening will improve the prediction of future CV events and help individuals be more compliant with lifestyle changes and possible medication recommended by their physician.

This might be a step forward for personalized preventive medicine, being especially relevant at an individual level, when clinicians need to weigh the importance of each risk factor and determine if the person needs therapy in addition to lifestyle advice.

The precise frequency of examinations is not pre-determined; it depends on the specific case, risk category and individual characteristics of a patient. The test may be added to the check-up programs or used as a stand along in conjunction with other clinical and diagnostic findings.

=== Lateral-flow test ===
Lateral-flow tests ("rapid diagnostic kits") have been developed for cardiac troponin I. The more basic kinds are qualitative and detect cTnI > 0.5 ng/L, sufficient to "rule in" serious cases in less than a minute. More advanced types allow a quantitative readout using colorimetry, electrochemical fluorescence, or a magnetic detector.
