= ACTC1 =

Protein-coding gene in the species Homo sapiens

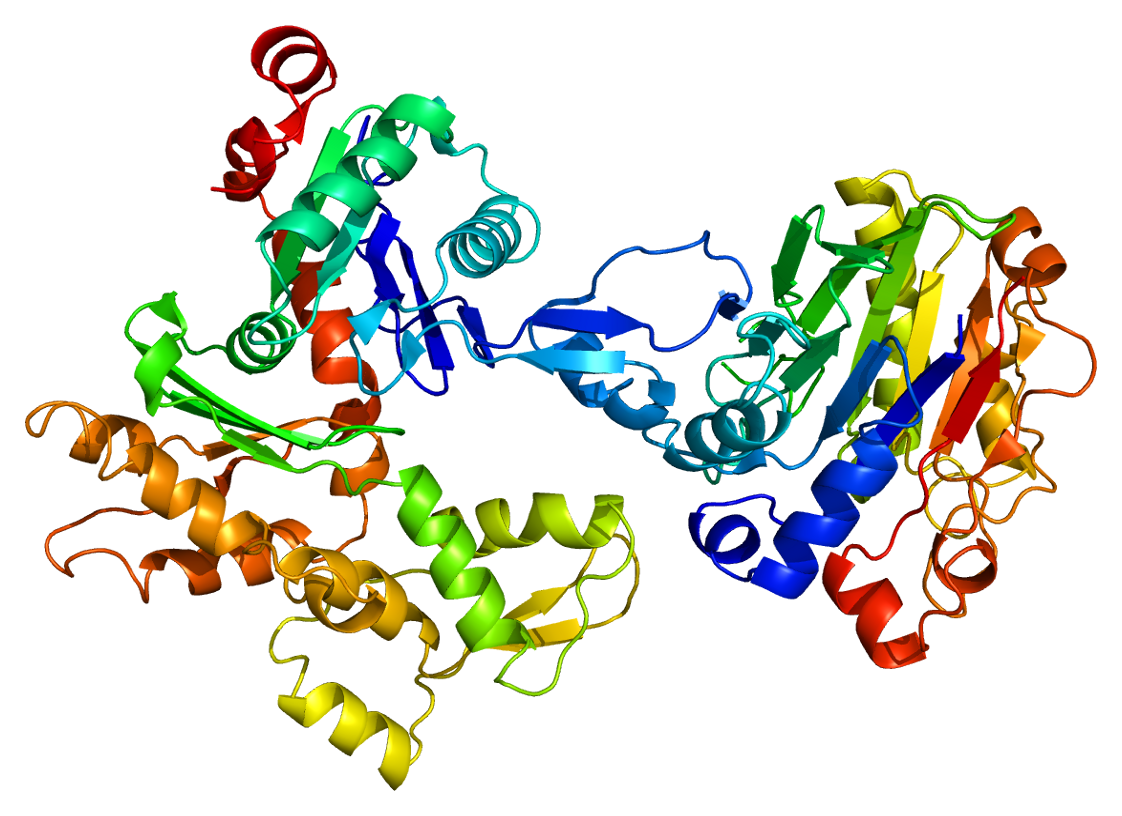

Identifiers
- Aliases: ACTC1, ACTC, ASD5, CMD1R, CMH11, LVNC4, actin, alpha, cardiac muscle 1, actin alpha cardiac muscle 1
- External IDs: OMIM: 102540; MGI: 87905; GeneCards: ACTC1

Gene location (Human)
Chr.	Chromosome 15 (human)
Band	15q14	Start	34,790,230 bp
Band	15q14	End	34,795,549 bp

Gene location (Mouse)
Chr.	Chromosome 2 (mouse)
Band	2 E4|2 57.55 cM	Start	113,877,763 bp
Band	2 E4|2 57.55 cM	End	113,884,029 bp
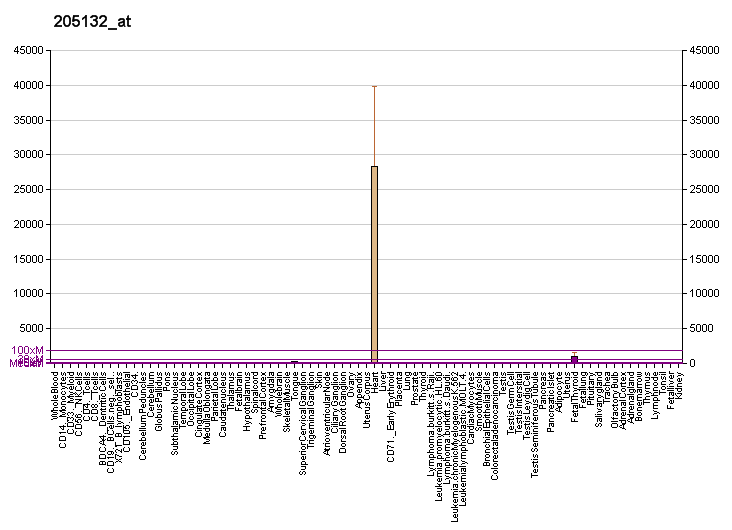
RNA expression pattern
Bgee	Human / Mouse (ortholog); Top expressed in: myocardium of left ventricle; right ventricle; cardiac muscle tissue of right atrium; right auricle of heart; apex of heart; vena cava; glutes; seminal vesicula; tibialis anterior muscle; popliteal artery / Top expressed in: atrioventricular valve; endocardial cushion; cardiac muscle tissue of left ventricle; atrium; interventricular septum; vastus lateralis muscle; triceps brachii muscle; human fetus; extraocular muscle; digastric muscle; More reference expression data
BioGPS	More reference expression data
Gene ontology
Molecular function	nucleotide binding; myosin binding; ATPase activity; ATP binding
Cellular component	cytoplasm; cell body; cytosol; blood microparticle; membrane; I band; focal adhesion; filopodium; sarcomere; actin filament; extracellular exosome; cytoskeleton; lamellipodium; extracellular space; synapse; glutamatergic synapse
Biological process	actin-myosin filament sliding; cardiac muscle contraction; actomyosin structure organization; negative regulation of apoptotic process; cardiac muscle tissue morphogenesis; actin filament-based movement; skeletal muscle thin filament assembly; cardiac myofibril assembly; actin-mediated cell contraction; positive regulation of gene expression; muscle filament sliding; mesenchyme migration; response to ethanol; heart contraction; apoptotic process; actin filament organization
Sources:Amigo / QuickGO
Orthologs
Databases	NCBI: entry; OMA: entry
Species	Human	Mouse
Entrez	70	11464
Ensembl	ENSG00000159251	ENSMUSG00000068614
UniProt	P68032	P68033
RefSeq (mRNA)	NM_005159	NM_009608
RefSeq (protein)	NP_005150	NP_033738
Location (UCSC)	Chr 15: 34.79 – 34.8 Mb	Chr 2: 113.88 – 113.88 Mb
PubMed search
- Wikidata
View/Edit Human	View/Edit Mouse

ACTC1 encodes cardiac muscle alpha actin. This isoform differs from the alpha actin that is expressed in skeletal muscle, ACTA1. Alpha cardiac actin is the major protein of the thin filament in cardiac sarcomeres, which are responsible for muscle contraction and generation of force to support the pump function of the heart.

== Structure ==
Cardiac alpha actin is a 42.0 kDa protein composed of 377 amino acids. Cardiac alpha actin is a filamentous protein extending from a complex mesh with cardiac alpha-actinin (ACTN2) at Z-lines towards the center of the sarcomere. Polymerization of globular actin (G-actin) leads to a structural filament (F-actin) in the form of a two-stranded helix. Each actin can bind to four others. The atomic structure of monomeric actin was solved by Kabsch et al., and closely thereafter this same group published the structure of the actin filament. Actins are highly conserved proteins; the alpha actins are found in muscle tissues and are a major constituent of the contractile apparatus. Cardiac (ACTC1) and skeletal (ACTA1) alpha actins differ by only four amino acids (Asp4Glu, Glu5Asp, Leu301Met, Ser360Thr; cardiac/skeletal). The actin monomer has two asymmetric domains; the larger inner domain comprised by sub-domains 3 and 4, and the smaller outer domain by sub-domains 1 and 2. Both the amino and carboxy-termini lie in sub-domain 1 of the outer domain.

== Function ==
Actin is a dynamic structure that can adapt two states of flexibility, with the greatest difference between the states occurring as a result of movement within sub-domain 2. Myosin binding increases the flexibility of actin, and cross-linking studies have shown that myosin subfragment-1 binds to actin amino acid residues 48-67 within actin sub-domain 2, which may account for this effect.

It has been suggested that the ACTC1 gene has a role during development. Experiments in chick embryos found an association between ACTC1 knockdown and a reduction in the atrial septa.

== Clinical significance ==
Polymorphisms in ACTC1 have been linked to dilated cardiomyopathy in a small number of Japanese patients. Further studies in patients from South Africa found no association. The E101K missense mutation has been associated with hypertrophic cardiomyopathy and left ventricular noncompaction. Another mutation has in the ACTC1 gene has been associated with atrial septal defects.
