= CKM =

CKM may refer to:

- Cabibbo–Kobayashi–Maskawa matrix in particle physics
- CKM (magazine), a Polish men's magazine
- C. K. McClatchy High School
- Cotton Keays & Morris, an Australian pop music band
- Creatine kinase, muscle, an enzyme
  - CKM (gene), a gene that in humans encodes the enzyme creatine kinase, muscle
- Cardiovascular–kidney–metabolic syndrome, 'CKM', a human systemic disease
