= Muscular system =

Internal framework of the body

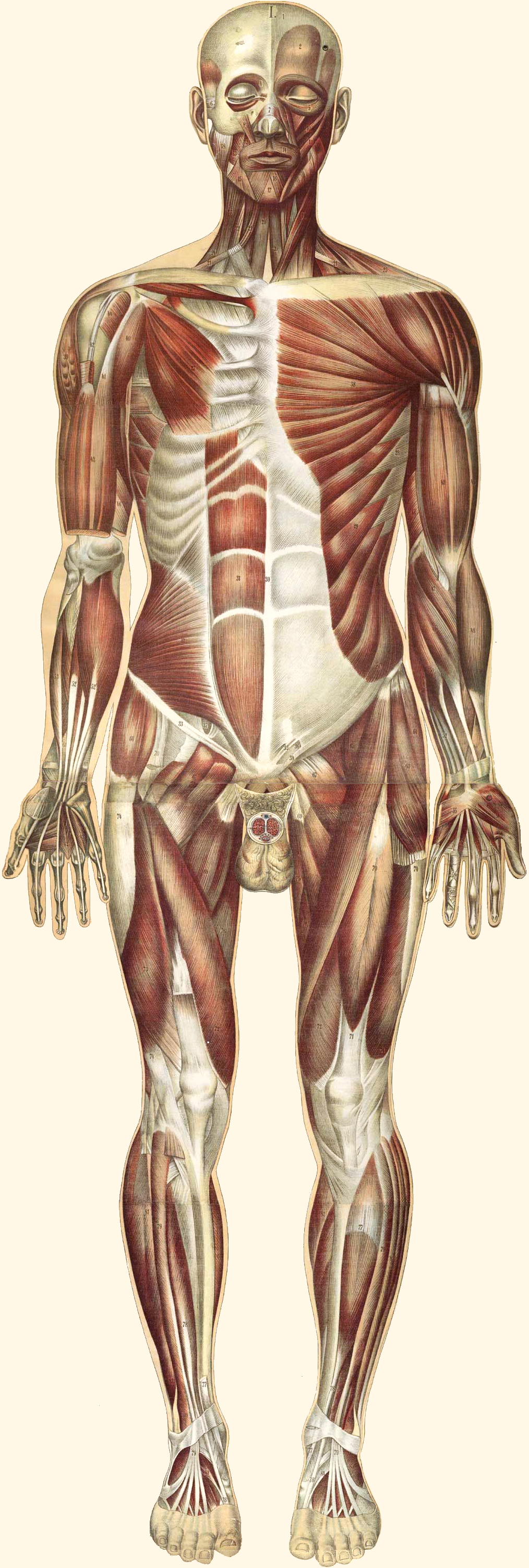
- The human muscles, shown on a male, seen from the front, 19th century illustration

Details

Identifiers
- Latin: systema musculare
- TA98: A04.0.00.000
- TA2: 1974
- FMA: 72954

The muscular system is an organ system consisting of skeletal, smooth, and cardiac muscle. It permits movement of the body, maintains posture, and circulates blood throughout the body. The muscular systems in vertebrates are controlled through the nervous system although some muscles (such as the cardiac muscle) can be completely autonomous. Together with the skeletal system in the human, it forms the musculoskeletal system, which is responsible for the movement of the body.

== Types ==
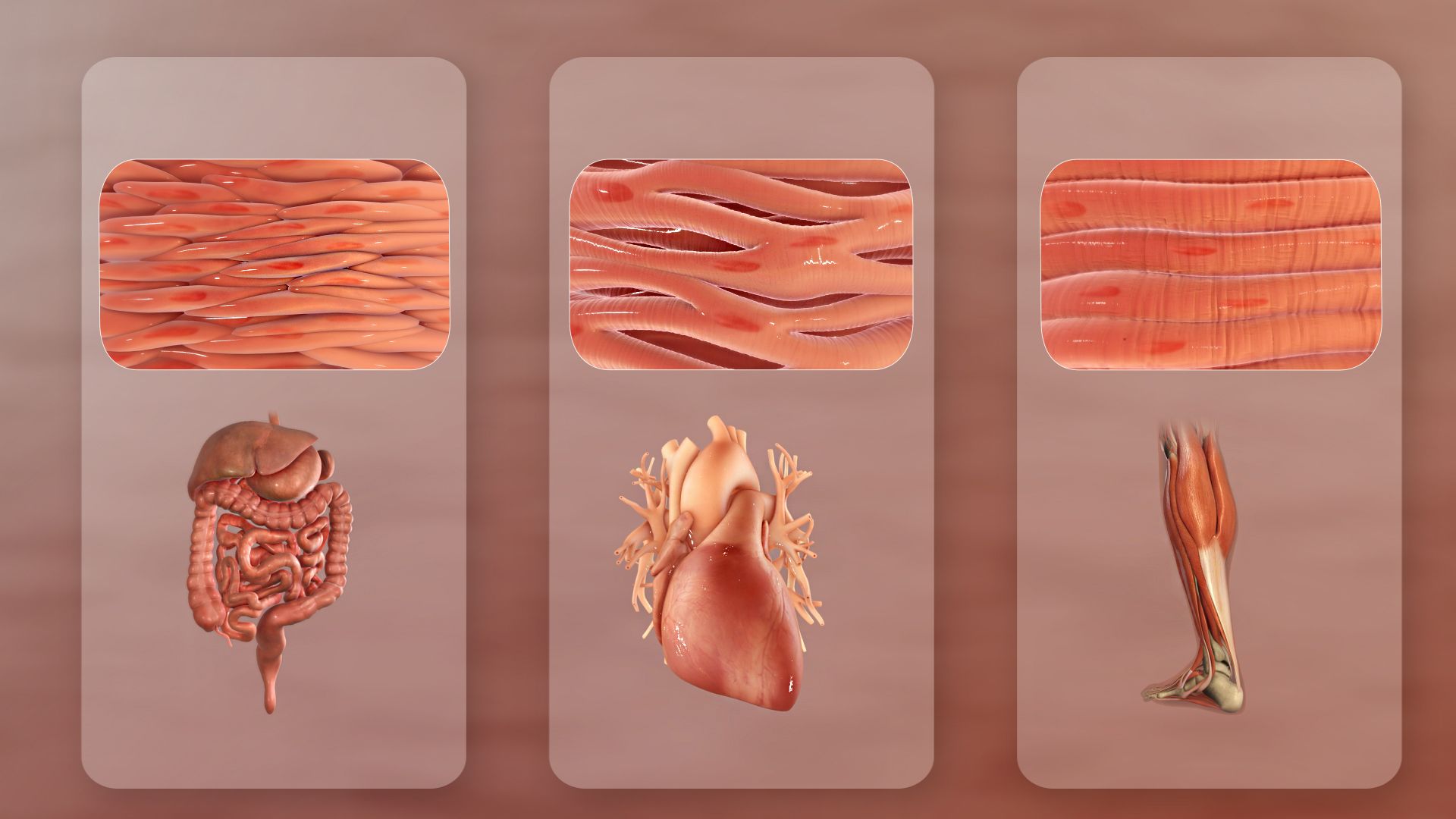
Three distinct types of muscle (L to R): Smooth (non-striated) muscle in internal organs, cardiac or heart muscle, and skeletal muscle.

There are three distinct types of muscle: skeletal muscle, cardiac or heart muscle, and smooth (non-striated) muscle. Muscles provide strength, balance, posture, movement, and heat for the body to keep warm.

There are more than 600 muscles in an adult male human body. A kind of elastic tissue makes up each muscle, which consists of thousands, or tens of thousands, of small muscle fibers. Each fiber comprises many tiny strands called fibrils, impulses from nerve cells control the contraction of each muscle fiber.

=== Skeletal ===
Skeletal muscle, is a type of striated muscle, composed of muscle cells, called muscle fibers, which are in turn composed of myofibrils. Myofibrils are composed of sarcomeres, the basic building blocks of striated muscle tissue. Upon stimulation by an action potential, skeletal muscles perform a coordinated contraction by shortening each sarcomere. The best proposed model for understanding contraction is the sliding filament model of muscle contraction. Within the sarcomere, actin and myosin fibers overlap in a contractile motion towards each other. Myosin filaments have club-shaped myosin heads that project toward the actin filaments, and provide attachment points on binding sites for the actin filaments. The myosin heads move in a coordinated style; they swivel toward the center of the sarcomere, detach, and then reattach to the nearest active site of the actin filament. This is called a ratchet-type drive system.

This process consumes large amounts of adenosine triphosphate (ATP), the energy source of the cell. ATP binds to the cross-bridges between myosin heads and actin filaments. The release of energy powers the swiveling of the myosin head. When ATP is used, it becomes adenosine diphosphate (ADP), and since muscles store little ATP, they must continuously replace the discharged ADP with ATP. Muscle tissue also contains a stored supply of a fast-acting recharge chemical, creatine phosphate, which when necessary can assist with the rapid regeneration of ADP into ATP.

Calcium ions are required for each cycle of the sarcomere. Calcium is released from the sarcoplasmic reticulum into the sarcomere when a muscle is stimulated to contract. This calcium uncovers the actin-binding sites. When the muscle no longer needs to contract, the calcium ions are pumped from the sarcomere and back into storage in the sarcoplasmic reticulum.

There are over 600 skeletal muscles in the human body (exact number varies by counting method) and skeletal muscle makes up ~40% of human mass.

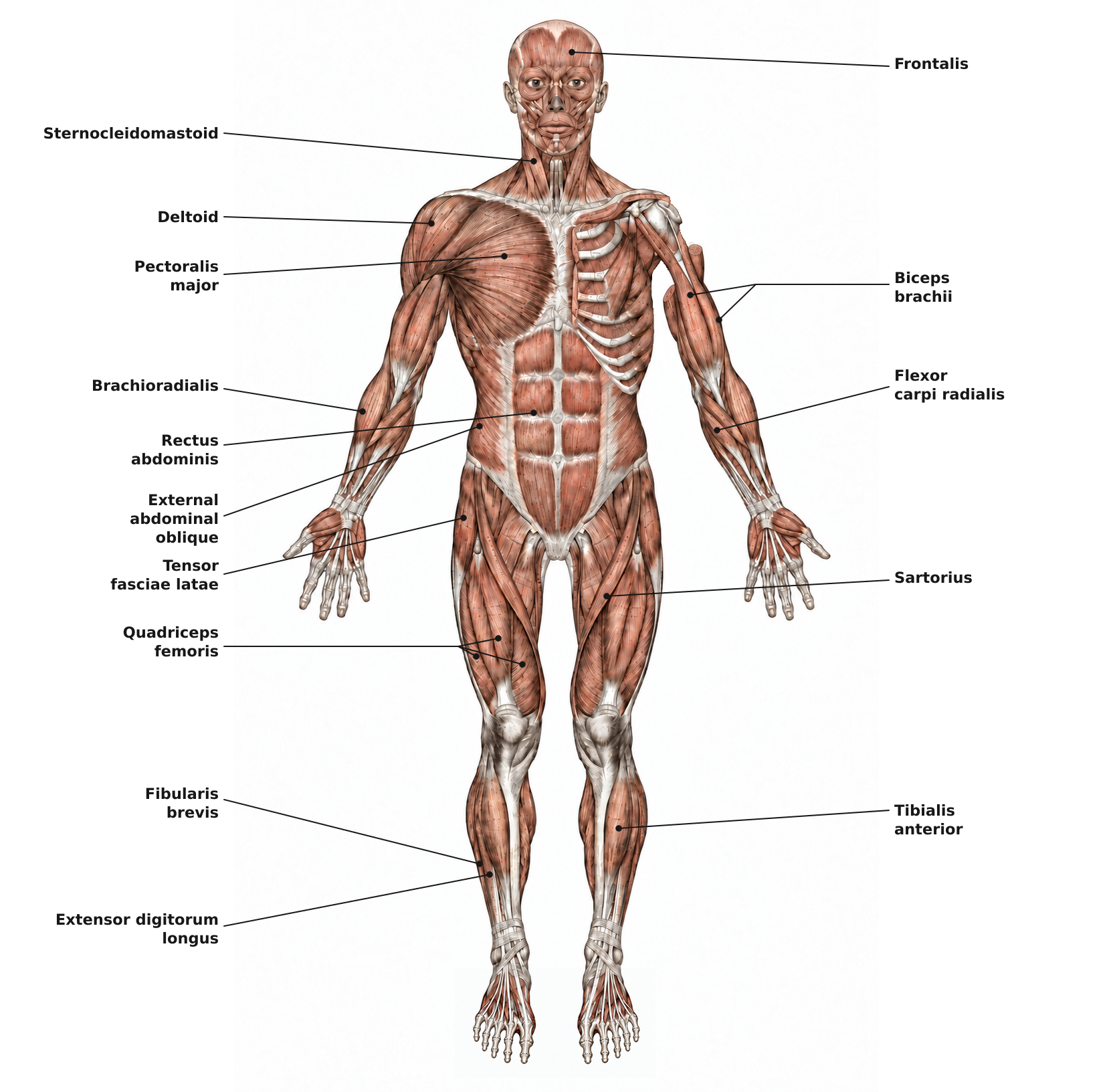
Skeletal muscles, viewed from the front

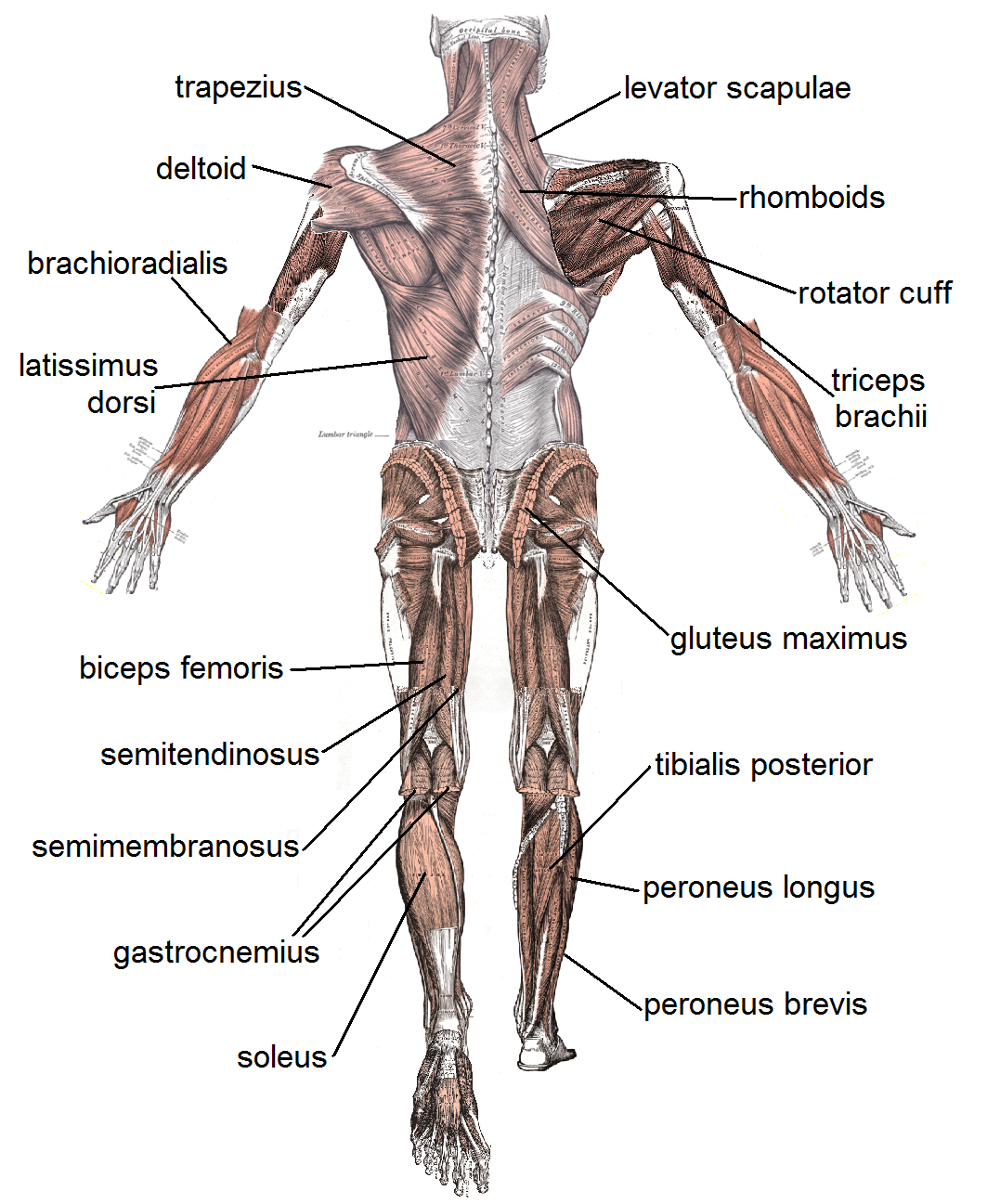
Skeletal muscles, viewed from the back

=== Cardiac ===
Heart muscle is striated muscle but is distinct from skeletal muscle because the muscle fibers are laterally connected. Furthermore, just as with smooth muscles, their movement is involuntary. Heart muscle is controlled by the sinus node influenced by the autonomic nervous system.

=== Smooth ===
Smooth muscle contraction is regulated by the autonomic nervous system, hormones, and local chemical signals, allowing for gradual and sustained contractions. This type of muscle tissue is also capable of adapting to different levels of stretch and tension, which is important for maintaining proper blood flow and the movement of materials through the digestive system.

== Physiology ==
=== Contraction ===
Neuromuscular junctions are the focal point where a motor neuron attaches to a muscle. Acetylcholine, (a neurotransmitter used in skeletal muscle contraction) is released from the axon terminal of the nerve cell when an action potential reaches the microscopic junction called a synapse. A group of chemical messengers across the synapse and stimulate the formation of electrical changes, which are produced in the muscle cell when the acetylcholine binds to receptors on its surface. Calcium is released from its storage area in the cell's sarcoplasmic reticulum. An impulse from a nerve cell causes calcium release and brings about a single, short muscle contraction called a muscle twitch. If there is a problem at the neuromuscular junction, a very prolonged contraction may occur, such as the muscle contractions that result from tetanus. Also, a loss of function at the junction can produce paralysis.

Skeletal muscles are organized into hundreds of motor units, each of which involves a motor neuron, attached by a series of thin finger-like structures called axon terminals. These attach to and control discrete bundles of muscle fibers. A coordinated and fine-tuned response to a specific circumstance will involve controlling the precise number of motor units used. While individual muscle units' contract as a unit, the entire muscle can contract on a predetermined basis due to the structure of the motor unit. Motor unit coordination, balance, and control frequently come under the direction of the cerebellum of the brain. This allows for complex muscular coordination with little conscious effort, such as when one drives a car without thinking about the process.

=== Tendon ===
A tendon is a piece of connective tissue that connects a muscle to a bone. When a muscle intercepts, it pulls against the skeleton to create movement. A tendon connects this muscle to a bone, making this function possible.

=== Aerobic and anaerobic muscle activity ===
At rest, the body produces the majority of its ATP aerobically in the mitochondria without producing lactic acid or other fatiguing byproducts. During exercise, the method of ATP production varies depending on the fitness of the individual as well as the duration and intensity of exercise. At lower activity levels, when exercise continues for a long duration (several minutes or longer), energy is produced aerobically by combining oxygen with carbohydrates and fats stored in the body.

During activity that is higher in intensity, with possible duration decreasing as intensity increases, ATP production can switch to anaerobic pathways, such as the use of the creatine phosphate and the phosphagen system or anaerobic glycolysis. Aerobic ATP production is biochemically much slower and can only be used for long-duration, low-intensity exercise, but produces no fatiguing waste products that cannot be removed immediately from the sarcomere and the body, and it results in a much greater number of ATP molecules per fat or carbohydrate molecule. Aerobic training allows the oxygen delivery system to be more efficient, allowing aerobic metabolism to begin quicker. Anaerobic ATP production produces ATP much faster and allows near-maximal intensity exercise, but also produces significant amounts of lactic acid which render high-intensity exercise unsustainable for more than several minutes. The phosphagen system is also anaerobic. It allows for the highest levels of exercise intensity, but intramuscular stores of phosphocreatine are very limited and can only provide energy for exercises lasting up to ten seconds. Recovery is very quick, with full creatine stores regenerated within five minutes.

== Clinical significance ==
Multiple diseases can affect the muscular system.

=== Muscular dystrophy ===
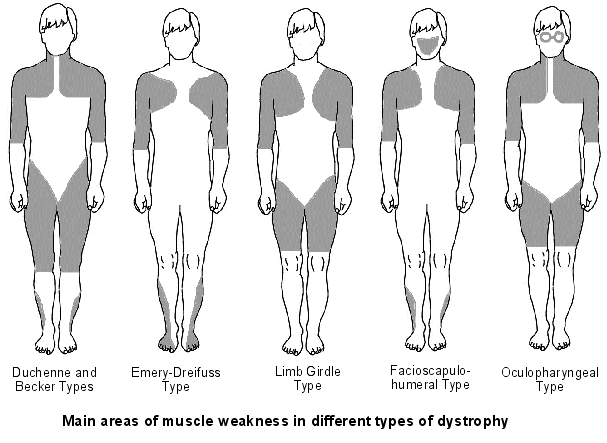
Main areas of muscle weakness in different types of dystrophy

Muscular dystrophy is a group of disorders associated with progressive muscle weakness and loss of muscle mass. These disorders are caused by genetic mutations. The disease affects between 19.8 and 25.1 per 100,000 person-years globally.

There are more than 30 types of muscular dystrophy. Depending on the type, muscular dystrophy can affect a person's heart and lungs, and can affect the ability to move, walk, and perform daily activities. The most common types include:

- Duchenne muscular dystrophy and Becker muscular dystrophy
- Myotonic dystrophy
- Limb-girdle muscular dystrophy
- Facioscapulohumeral dystrophy
- Congenital dystrophy
- Distal
- Oculopharyngeal muscular dystrophy
- Emery–Dreifuss muscular dystrophy

=== Autoimmune conditions ===
The two main autoimmune conditions that impact the muscular system are myositis (including polymyositis and dermatomyositis), and myasthenia gravis.

Hypotonia

Loss of muscular tone or a diminished resistance to passive stretching.

Myositis

Inflammation of muscles

Rhabdomyolysis

Breakdown of skeletal muscle with release of intracellular contents

- Major systems of the human body
- Intramuscular coordination

=== Amyotrophic lateral sclerosis ===
A terminal neurodegenerative disease that occurs when the motor neurons undergo progressive degeneration and eventually poorly receive signals causing the muscle to waste away,most cases are sporadic, meaning they are generally occur without a cause. Its initial detection is quite rare as it first mimics s muscle strain or fatigue and is only detected in electromyography (EMG) showing widespread lower motor neuron degeneration, or clinical evidence of progressive upper motor neuron dysfunction, and the exclusion of mimicking pathologies. It is also known as Lou Gehrig's disease or Charcot's disease,

Unfortunately,there is no cure for ALS, its progression can only be slowed down and death usually occours by the end of 5 years,generally caused due to respiratory failure

- Disease-modifying medications like Rilozule can aid in temporary relief
- Non-invasive ventilation,and feeding tubes are generally given to support patients

| Initial symptoms | Rapid weakening of muscles or Stiff muscles |
| Late symptoms | Difficulty in voluntary tasks like speaking and breathing,eventually disabling the individual |
| Age | Major symptoms occour after 50 |
| Cause | Although the original cause is not yet found,some believe genetics plays a key role |

Lou Gehring and Stephen Hawking are renowned personalities known to be affected

=== Muscle strain ===
The stretching and tearing of muscle caused due sudden application of force,classified as Grade I,II or III depending on the intensity
