= CKMT1B =

Protein and coding gene in humans

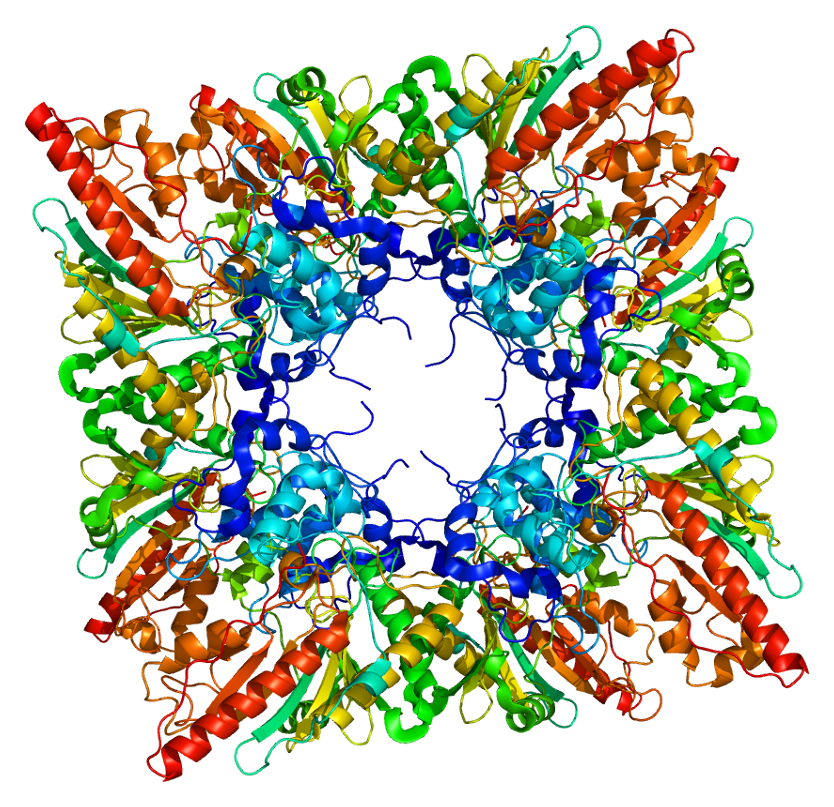

Identifiers
- Aliases: CKMT1B, CKMT, CKMT1, UMTCK, creatine kinase, mitochondrial 1B
- External IDs: OMIM: 123290; MGI: 99441; GeneCards: CKMT1B
Available structures
PDB	Ortholog search: PDBe RCSB
PDB	List of PDB id codes 1QK1
Enzyme activity
EC #	BRENDA	ExPASy	KEGG	MetaCyc
2.7.3.2	↗	↗	↗	↗

Gene location (Human)
Chr.	Chromosome 15 (human)
Band	15q15.3	Start	43,593,054 bp
Band	15q15.3	End	43,604,901 bp

Gene location (Mouse)
Chr.	Chromosome 2 (mouse)
Band	2 E5|2 60.37 cM	Start	121,188,195 bp
Band	2 E5|2 60.37 cM	End	121,194,218 bp
RNA expression pattern
Bgee	Human / Mouse (ortholog); Top expressed in: right hemisphere of cerebellum; mucosa of transverse colon; primary visual cortex; duodenum; rectum; superior frontal gyrus; right frontal lobe; Brodmann area 9; mucosa of esophagus; anterior cingulate cortex / Top expressed in: left colon; epithelium of stomach; duodenum; mucous cell of stomach; molar; medial vestibular nucleus; ileum; pyloric antrum; facial motor nucleus; pontine nuclei; More reference expression data
BioGPS	n/a
Gene ontology
Molecular function	transferase activity; creatine kinase activity; nucleotide binding; transferase activity, transferring phosphorus-containing groups; catalytic activity; ATP binding; kinase activity
Cellular component	mitochondrial inner membrane; membrane; mitochondrion
Biological process	creatine metabolic process; phosphorylation; phosphocreatine biosynthetic process
Sources:Amigo / QuickGO
Orthologs
Databases	NCBI: entry; OMA: entry
Species	Human	Mouse
Entrez	1159	12716
Ensembl	ENSG00000237289	ENSMUSG00000000308
UniProt	P12532	P30275
RefSeq (mRNA)	NM_020990; NM_001375484	NM_009897; NM_001355069
RefSeq (protein)	NP_001015001; NP_001308855; NP_001308856; NP_001308857; NP_001308858 NP_001362413; NP_066270	NP_034027; NP_001341998
Location (UCSC)	Chr 15: 43.59 – 43.6 Mb	Chr 2: 121.19 – 121.19 Mb
PubMed search
- Wikidata
View/Edit Human	View/Edit Mouse

Creatine kinase, mitochondrial 1B also known as CKMT1B is one of two genes which encode the ubiquitous mitochondrial creatine kinase (ubiquitous mtCK or CKMT1).

== Function ==
Mitochondrial creatine (MtCK) kinase is responsible for the transfer of high energy phosphate from mitochondria to the cytosolic carrier, creatine. It belongs to the creatine kinase isoenzyme family. It exists as two isoenzymes, sarcomeric MtCK (CKMT2) and ubiquitous MtCK, encoded by separate genes. Mitochondrial creatine kinase occurs in two different oligomeric forms: dimers and octamers, in contrast to the exclusively dimeric cytosolic creatine kinase isoenzymes. Ubiquitous mitochondrial creatine kinase has 80% homology with the coding exons of sarcomeric mitochondrial creatine kinase. Two genes located near each other on chromosome 15 (CKMT1A and CKMT1B (this gene)) have been identified which encode identical mitochondrial creatine kinase proteins.

== Clinical significance ==
Many malignant cancers with poor prognosis have shown overexpression of ubiquitous mitochondrial creatine kinase; this may be related to high energy turnover and failure to eliminate cancer cells via apoptosis.
