= Cardiac marker =

Biomarkers relevant to heart function

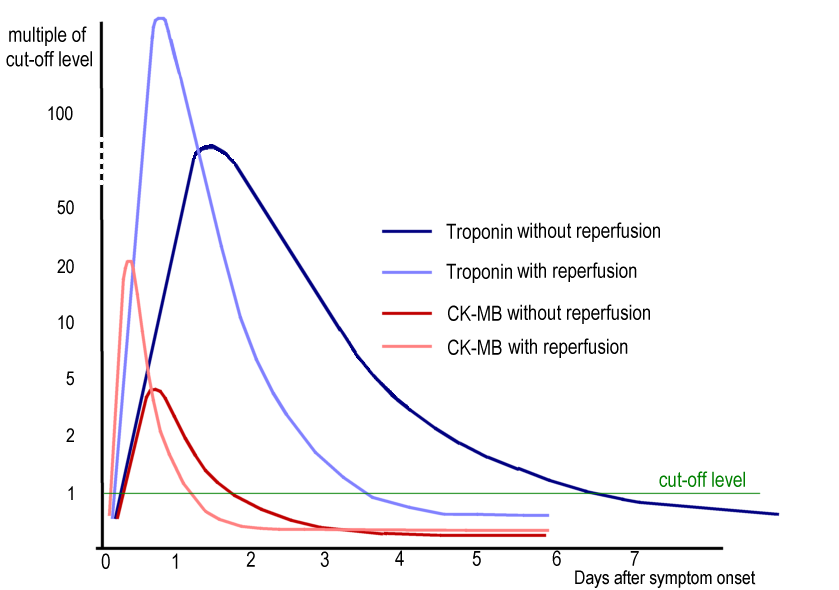
- Kinetics of cardiac markers Troponin and CK-MB in myocardial infarction with or without reperfusion treatment.
- LOINC: 58260-1

Cardiac markers are biomarkers measured to evaluate heart function. They can be useful in the early prediction or diagnosis of disease. Although they are often discussed in the context of myocardial infarction, other conditions can lead to an elevation in cardiac marker level.

Cardiac markers are used for the diagnosis and risk stratification of patients with chest pain and suspected acute coronary syndrome and for management and prognosis in patients with diseases like acute heart failure.

Most of the early markers identified were enzymes, and as a result, the term "cardiac enzymes" is sometimes used. However, not all of the markers currently used are enzymes. For example, in formal usage, troponin would not be listed as a cardiac enzyme.

== Applications of measurement ==
Measuring cardiac biomarkers can be a step toward making a diagnosis for a condition. Whereas cardiac imaging often confirms a diagnosis, simpler and less expensive cardiac biomarker measurements can advise a physician whether more complicated or invasive procedures are warranted. In many cases medical societies advise doctors to make biomarker measurements an initial testing strategy especially for patients at low risk of cardiac death.

Many acute cardiac marker IVD products are targeted at nontraditional markets, e.g., the hospital ER instead of traditional hospital or clinical laboratory environments. Competition in the development of cardiac marker diagnostic products and their expansion into new markets is intense.

Recently, the intentional destruction of myocardium by alcohol septal ablation has led to the identification of additional potential markers.

== Types ==
Types of cardiac markers include the following:

| Test | Sensitivity and specificity | Approximate peak | Description |
|---|---|---|---|
| Troponin test | The most sensitive and specific test for myocardial damage. Because it has increased specificity compared with CK-MB, troponin is composed of 3 proteins- Troponin C, Cardic troponin I, and Cardiac troponin T. Troponin I especially has a high affinity for myocardial injury. | 12 hours | Troponin is released during MI from the cytosolic pool of the myocytes. Its subsequent release is prolonged with degradation of actin and myosin filaments. Isoforms of the protein, T and I, are specific to myocardium. Differential diagnosis of troponin elevation includes acute infarction, severe pulmonary embolism causing acute right heart overload, heart failure, myocarditis. Troponins can also calculate infarct size but the peak must be measured in the 3rd day. After myocyte injury, troponin is released in 2–4 hours and persists for up to 7 days. Normal value are - Troponin I <0.3 ng/ml and Troponin T <0.2 ng/ml. In patients with non-severe asymptomatic aortic valve stenosis and no overt coronary artery disease, the increased troponin T (above 14 pg/mL) was found associated with an increased 5-year event rate of ischemic cardiac events (myocardial infarction, percutaneous coronary intervention, or coronary artery bypass surgery). |
| Creatine Kinase (CK-MB) test | It is relatively specific when skeletal muscle damage is not present. | 10–24 hours | The CK-MB isoform of creatine kinase is expressed in heart muscle. It resides in the cytosol and facilitates movement of high energy phosphates into and out of mitochondria. Since it has a short duration, it cannot be used for late diagnosis of acute MI but can be used to suggest infarct extension if levels rise again. This is usually back to normal within 2–3 days. Normal range - 2-6 ng/ml |
| Lactate dehydrogenase (LDH) | LDH is not as specific as troponin. | 72 hours | Lactate dehydrogenase catalyses the conversion of pyruvate to lactate. LDH-1 isozyme is normally found in the heart muscle and LDH-2 is found predominantly in blood serum. A high LDH-1 level to LDH-2 suggest MI. LDH levels are also high in tissue breakdown or hemolysis. It can mean cancer, meningitis, encephalitis, or HIV. This is usually back to normal 10–14 days. |
| Aspartate transaminase (AST) | | | This was the first used. It is not specific for heart damage, and it is also one of the liver transaminases. |
| Myoglobin (Mb) | low specificity for myocardial infarction | 2 hours | Myoglobin is used less than the other markers. Myoglobin is the primary oxygen-carrying pigment of muscle tissue. It is high when muscle tissue is damaged but it lacks specificity. It has the advantage of responding very rapidly, rising and falling earlier than CK-MB or troponin. It also has been used in assessing reperfusion after thrombolysis. |
| Ischemia-modified albumin (IMA) | low specificity | | IMA can be detected via the albumin cobalt binding (ACB) test, a limited available FDA approved assay. Myocardial ischemia alters the N-terminus of albumin reducing the ability of cobalt to bind to albumin. IMA measures ischemia in the blood vessels and thus returns results in minutes rather than traditional markers of necrosis that take hours. ACB test has low specificity therefore generating high number of false positives and must be used in conjunction with typical acute approaches such as ECG and physical exam. Additional studies are required. |
| Pro-brain natriuretic peptide | | | This is increased in patients with heart failure. It has been approved as a marker for acute congestive heart failure. Patients with < 80 have a much higher rate of symptom-free survival within a year. Generally, pt with CHF will have > 100. In patients with non-severe asymptomatic aortic valve stenosis, increased age- and sex-adjusted N-terminal pro-brain natriuretic peptide (NT-proBNP) levels alone and combined with a 50% or greater increase from baseline had been found associated with increased event rates of aortic valve stenosis related events (cardiovascular death, hospitalization with heart failure due to progression of aortic valve stenosis, or aortic valve replacement surgery). |
| Glycogen phosphorylase isoenzyme BB | 0.854 and 0.767 | 7 hours | Glycogen phosphorylase isoenzyme BB (abbreviation: GPBB) is one of the three isoforms of glycogen phosphorylase. This isoform of the enzyme exists in cardiac (heart) and brain tissue. Because of the blood–brain barrier, GP-BB can be seen as being specific to heart muscle. GP-BB is one of the "new cardiac markers" which are considered to improve early diagnosis in acute coronary syndrome. During the process of ischemia, GP-BB is converted into a soluble form and is released into the blood. A rapid rise in blood levels can be seen in myocardial infarction and unstable angina. GP-BB is elevated 1–3 hours after process of ischemia. |

== Limitations ==
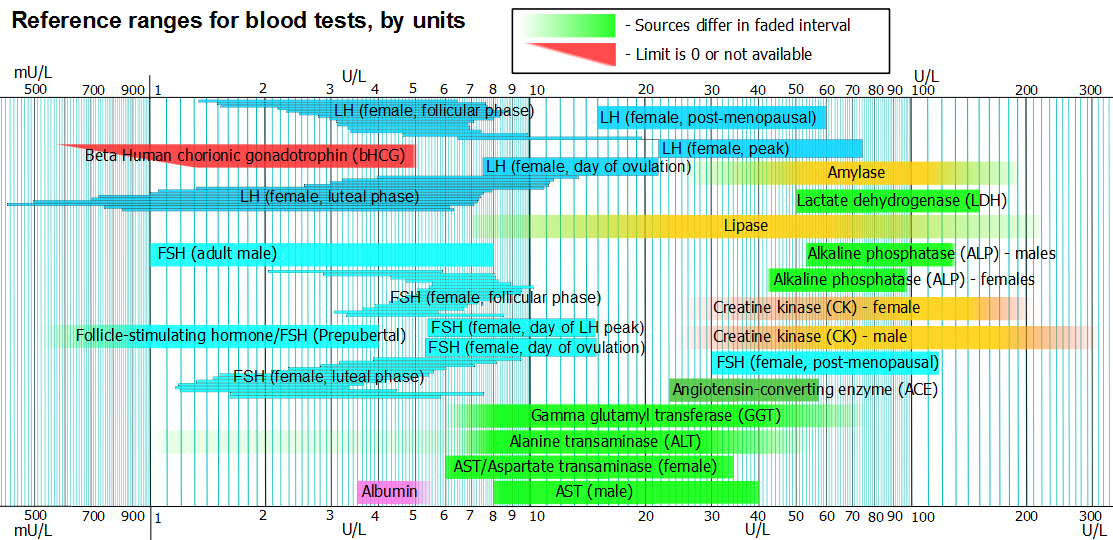
Reference ranges for blood tests, measured in units, including several cardiac markers.

Depending on the marker, it can take between 2 and 24 hours for the level to increase in the blood. Additionally, determining the levels of cardiac markers in the laboratory - like many other lab measurements - takes substantial time. Cardiac markers are therefore not useful in diagnosing a myocardial infarction in the acute phase. The clinical presentation and results from an ECG are more appropriate in the acute situation.

However, in 2010, research at the Baylor College of Medicine revealed that, using diagnostic nanochips and a swab of the cheek, cardiac biomarker readings from saliva can, with the ECG readings, determine within minutes whether someone is likely to have had a heart attack.

Comparison of cardiac markers over time
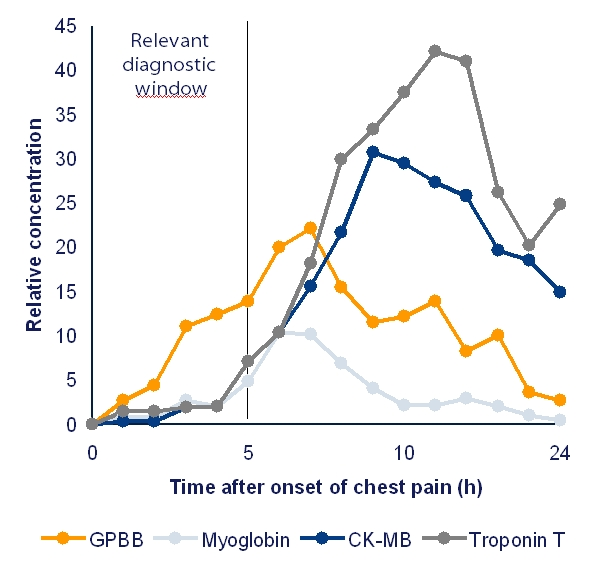
Comparison of cardiac marker in the first hours after chestpain onset and the relative concentration.

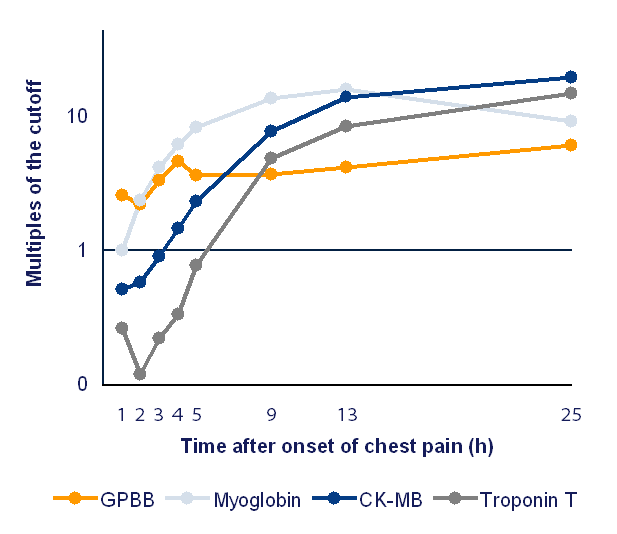
Comparison of cardiac marker in the first hours after chestpain onset and the multiples of the cutoff.

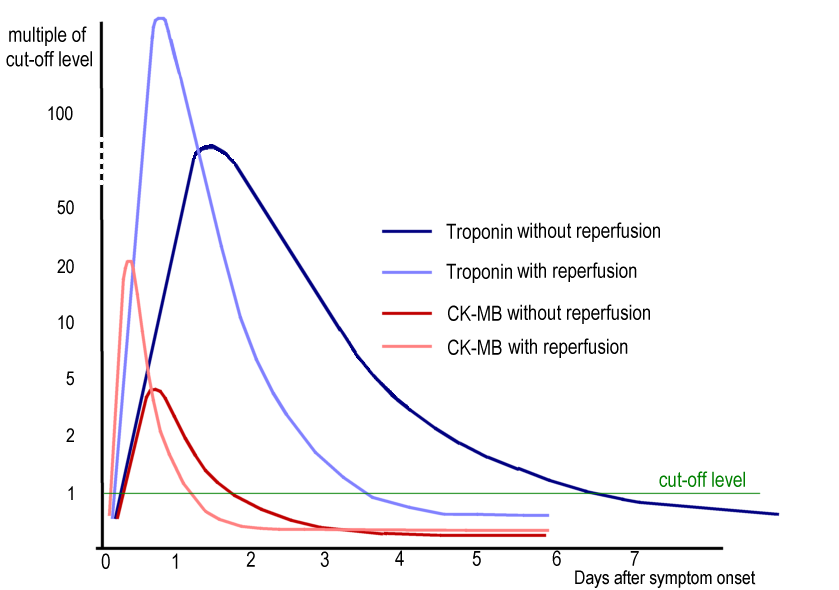
Kinetics of cardiac markers in myocardial infarction with or without reperfusion treatment.

== See also ==
- Myocardial markers in myocardial infarction
- Reference ranges for blood tests § Cardiac tests
