= Creatine phosphate shuttle =

Intracellular energy shuttle in muscles

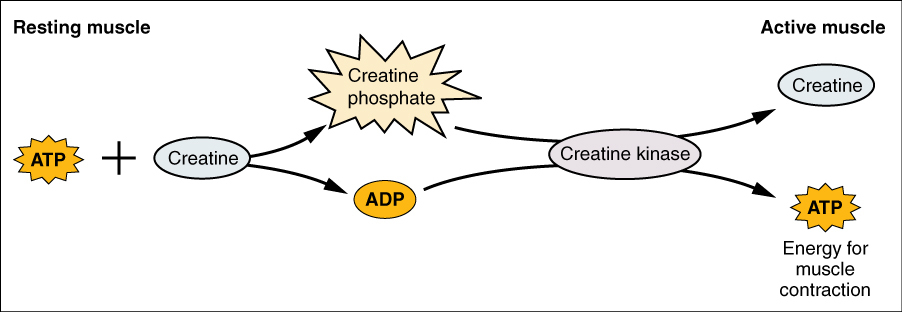
A simplified diagram showing the role of creatine phosphate in transporting energy for muscle contraction

The creatine phosphate shuttle is an intracellular energy shuttle which facilitates transport of high energy phosphate from muscle cell mitochondria to myofibrils. This is part of phosphocreatine metabolism. In mitochondria, Adenosine triphosphate (ATP) levels are very high as a result of glycolysis, TCA cycle, oxidative phosphorylation processes, whereas creatine phosphate levels are low. This makes conversion of creatine to phosphocreatine a highly favored reaction. Phosphocreatine is a very-high-energy compound. It then diffuses from mitochondria to myofibrils.

In myofibrils, during exercise (contraction) ADP levels are very high, which favors resynthesis of ATP. Thus, phosphocreatine breaks down to creatine, giving its inorganic phosphate for ATP formation. This is done by the enzyme creatine phosphokinase which transduces energy from the transport molecule of phosphocreatine to the useful molecule for contraction demands, ATP, an action performed by ATPase in the myofibril. The resulting creatine product acts as a signal molecule indicating myofibril contraction and diffuses in the opposite direction of phosphocreatine, back towards the mitochondrial intermembrane space where it can be rephosphorylated by creatine phosphokinase.

At the onset of exercise phosphocreatine is broken down to provide ATP for muscle contraction. ATP hydrolysis results in products of ADP and inorganic phosphate. The inorganic phosphate will be transported into the mitochondrial matrix, while the free creatine passes through the outer membrane where it will be resynthesized into PCr. The antiporter transports the ADP into the matrix, while transporting ATP out. Due to the high concentration of ATP around the mitochondrial creatine kinase, it will convert ATP into PCr which will then move back out into the cells cytoplasm to be converted into ATP (by cytoplasmic creatine kinase) to be used as energy for muscle contraction.

In some vertebrates, arginine phosphate plays a similar role.

== History ==
The idea of the creatine phosphate shuttle was suggested as an explanation for altered blood glucose levels in exercising diabetic patients. The change in blood glucose levels were very similar to the alterations that would occur if a diabetic patient would receive a shot of Insulin. It was then proposed that contraction of myofibrils during rigorous exercise freed creatine which imitated the effects of Insulin by consumption of ATP and releasing ADP. With the discovery of the mitochondrial isozyme of creatine kinase which participates in the shuttle, the other isozyme in the cytosol, Samuel Bessman further contributed to the creatine phosphate shuttle and proposed that the reversible properties of the creatine kinase enzyme was why exercise in diabetic patients can imitate the effects of Insulin.

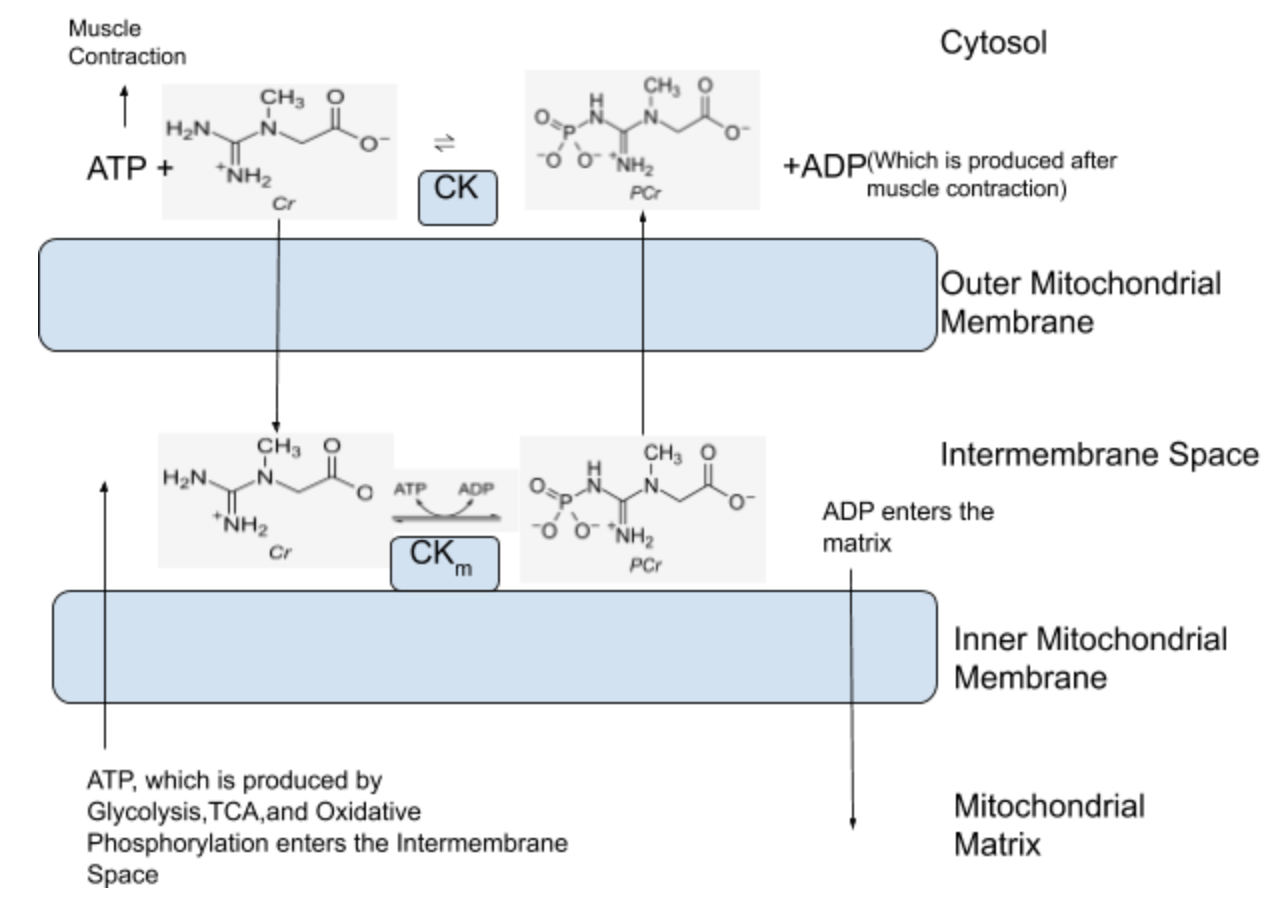
Creatine Phosphate Shuttle, Modified Diagram based on
