= Macro-creatine kinase =

Medical laboratory measurement

Macro-creatine kinase (macro-CK) is a macroenzyme, an enzyme of high molecular weight and prolonged half-life found in human serum. It is one of the most common macroenzymes. Macro-CK type 1 is a complex formed by one of the creatine kinase isoenzyme types, typically CK-BB, and antibodies; typically IgG, sometimes IgA, rarely IgM. Macro-CK type 2 is formed from mitochondrial CK polymer.

Macro-CK type 1 has been associated with autoimmune and other chronic conditions. Macro-CK type 2 has been associated with malignancy.

Macro-CK has been implicated as a source of interference in interpretation of medical labs.
