= Glycogen phosphorylase isoenzyme BB =

Enzyme

Glycogen phosphorylase isoenzyme BB (abbreviation: GPBB) is an isoenzyme of glycogen phosphorylase. This isoform of the enzyme exists in cardiac (heart) and brain tissue.

The enzyme is one of the "new cardiac markers" which are discussed to improve early diagnosis in acute coronary syndrome. A rapid rise in blood levels can be seen in myocardial infarction and unstable angina.

Other enzymes related to glycogen phosphorylase are abbreviated as GPLL (liver) and GPMM (muscle).
