= CKMT2 =

Protein and coding gene in humans

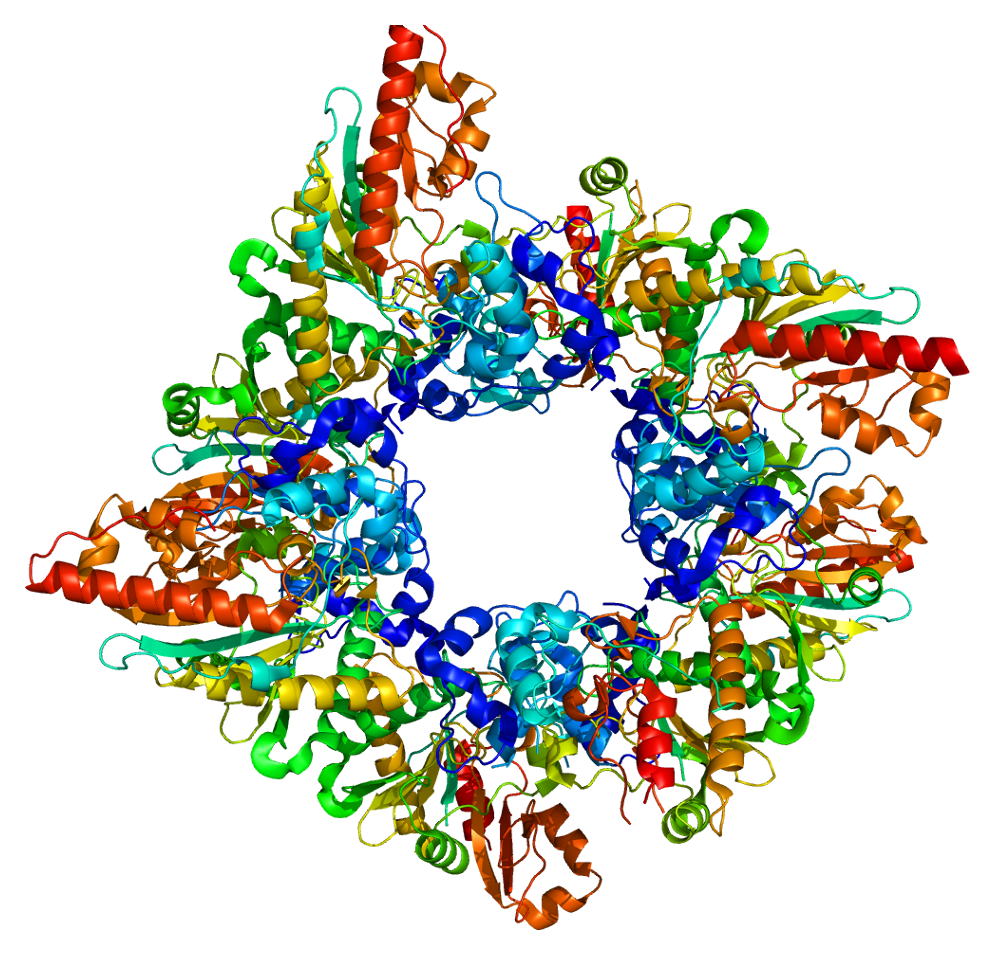

Identifiers
- Aliases: CKMT2, SMTCK, creatine kinase, mitochondrial 2
- External IDs: OMIM: 123295; MGI: 1923972; GeneCards: CKMT2
Available structures
PDB	Ortholog search: PDBe RCSB
PDB	List of PDB id codes 4Z9M
Enzyme activity
EC #	BRENDA	ExPASy	KEGG	MetaCyc
2.7.3.2	↗	↗	↗	↗

Gene location (Human)
Chr.	Chromosome 5 (human)
Band	5q14.1	Start	81,233,320 bp
Band	5q14.1	End	81,266,398 bp

Gene location (Mouse)
Chr.	Chromosome 13 (mouse)
Band	13|13 C3	Start	92,001,506 bp
Band	13|13 C3	End	92,025,004 bp
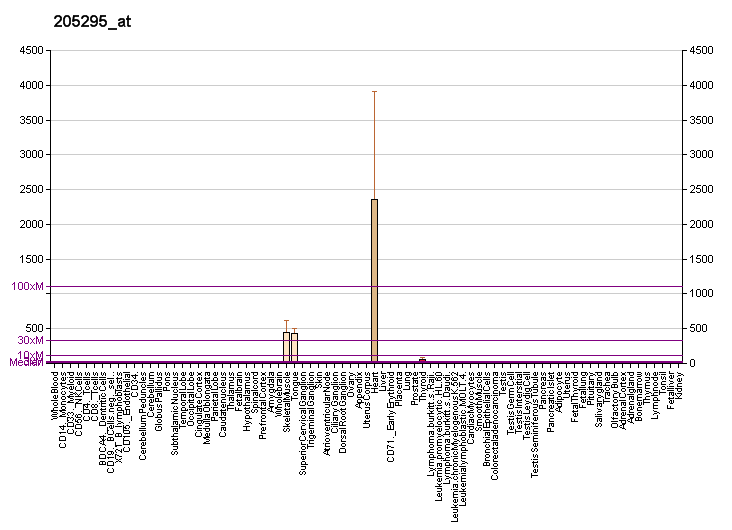
RNA expression pattern
Bgee	Human / Mouse (ortholog); Top expressed in: right ventricle; apex of heart; myocardium of left ventricle; right auricle of heart; gastrocnemius muscle; biceps brachii; Skeletal muscle tissue of biceps brachii; thoracic diaphragm; vastus lateralis muscle; muscle of thigh / Top expressed in: plantaris muscle; extraocular muscle; interventricular septum; cardiac muscle tissue of left ventricle; soleus muscle; digastric muscle; extensor digitorum longus muscle; tibialis anterior muscle; sternocleidomastoid muscle; masseter muscle; More reference expression data
BioGPS	More reference expression data
Gene ontology
Molecular function	transferase activity; creatine kinase activity; nucleotide binding; transferase activity, transferring phosphorus-containing groups; catalytic activity; ATP binding; kinase activity
Cellular component	mitochondrial inner membrane; membrane; mitochondrion
Biological process	creatine metabolic process; muscle contraction; phosphorylation; phosphocreatine biosynthetic process
Sources:Amigo / QuickGO
Orthologs
Databases	NCBI: entry; OMA: entry
Species	Human	Mouse
Entrez	1160	76722
Ensembl	ENSG00000131730	ENSMUSG00000021622
UniProt	P17540	Q6P8J7
RefSeq (mRNA)	NM_001825; NM_001099735; NM_001099736	NM_198415
RefSeq (protein)	NP_001093205; NP_001093206; NP_001816; NP_001093205.1; NP_001093206.1 NP_001816.2	NP_940807
Location (UCSC)	Chr 5: 81.23 – 81.27 Mb	Chr 13: 92 – 92.03 Mb
PubMed search
- Wikidata
View/Edit Human	View/Edit Mouse

Creatine kinase S-type, mitochondrial is an enzyme that in humans is encoded by the CKMT2 gene.

Mitochondrial creatine kinase (MtCK) is responsible for the transfer of high energy phosphate from mitochondria to the cytosolic carrier, creatine. The "energy-rich" gamma-phosphate group of ATP that is generated by oxidative phosphorylation inside mitochondria is trans-phosphorylated to creatine (Cr) to give phospho-creatine (PCr), which then is exported from the mitochondria into the cytosol, where it is made available to cytosolic creatine kinases (CK) for in situ regeneration of the ATP that has been used for cellular work. Cr then is returning to the mitochondria where it stimulates mitochondrial respiration and again is charged-up by mitochondrial ATP via MtCK. This process is termed the PCr/Cr-shuttle or circuit. MtCK belongs to the creatine kinase (CK) isoenzyme family. It exists as two isoenzymes, sarcomeric MtCK and ubiquitous MtCK, encoded by separate genes. Mitochondrial creatine kinase occurs in two different oligomeric forms: dimers and octamers, in contrast to the exclusively dimeric cytosolic creatine kinase isoenzymes. Sarcomeric mitochondrial creatine kinase has 80% homology with the coding exons of ubiquitous mitochondrial creatine kinase. This gene contains sequences homologous to several motifs that are shared among some nuclear genes encoding mitochondrial proteins and thus may be essential for the coordinated activation of these genes during mitochondrial biogenesis.
