= David Nachmansohn =

German-Jewish biochemist (1899–1983)

- Born: 17 March 1899; Ekaterinoslav, Russia (now Dnipro, Ukraine)
- Died: 2 November 1983 (aged 84); New York
- Known for: Role of phosphocreatine in energy production and the role of the neurotransmitter acetylcholine
- Scientific career
- Fields: Biochemistry
- Institutions: Sorbonne, Kaiser-Wilhelm Institut für Biologie, Berlin; Sorbonne University; Yale University; Columbia University

David Nachmansohn (17 March 1899 – 2 November 1983) was a German-Jewish biochemist responsible for elucidating the role of phosphocreatine in energy production in the muscles, and the role of the neurotransmitter acetylcholine in nerve stimulation. He is also recognised for his basic research into the biochemistry and mechanism underlying bioelectric phenomena.

== Early life and education ==
He was born in Ekaterinoslav, Russia (now Dnipro, Ukraine), moving to Berlin at an early age. In 1926, he went to the Kaiser-Wilhelm Institut für Biologie where he worked in the laboratory under Otto Meyerhof.

Nachmansohn discovered that rapidly contracting muscles contained more phosphocreatine than slowly contracting ones, which eventually led to the hypothesis that phosphocreatine was involved in the regeneration of the ATP that was built up to provide energy during muscular contraction.

== Research career ==
Leaving Nazi-era Berlin, Nachmansohn arrived in Paris in 1933 and took up a position in the Sorbonne. There he discovered that acetylcholinesterase is present at high concentrations in many different types of excitable nerve and muscle fibres and in brain tissue - lending support for Otto Loewi and Henry Dale's then novel proposal that acetylcholine functions in the transmission of impulses from nerves across junctions to other nerves or to muscles.

Nachmansohn obtained very active solutions of acetylcholinesterase from the electric organ of the marbled electric ray (Torpedo marmorata). Nachmansohn moved to Yale University in 1939 and while there published studies confirming the presence of an even higher concentration of acetylcholinesterase in the electric organ of electric eels (Electrophorus electricus). This work also demonstrated a strong connection between the release of acetylcholine and the electric discharge.

In 1942, Nachmansohn moved into a laboratory at Columbia University where his group continued to publish on the mechanism underlying electric discharge in fish; using electric eels provided by the aquarium of the New York Zoological Society.

== Honours and affiliations ==
David Nachmansohn was elected a member of the Leopoldina in 1963 and became a member of the National Academy of Sciences (USA) in 1965. He was made an Honorary Fellow of the Weizmann Institute in 1972.
