= Cardiorenal syndrome =

When dysfunction of the kidneys or heart induces dysfunction in the other

- Specialty: Nephrology, cardiology

Cardiorenal syndrome (CRS) is the spectrum of disorders in which acute or chronic dysfunction of the heart or kidneys leads to acute or chronic dysfunction of the other.

The condition is classified into five subtypes based on the primary organ dysfunction and whether the disease process is acute or chronic. The heart and the kidneys maintain hemodynamic stability and organ perfusion through an intricate network. CRS results from a complex interplay of hemodynamic alterations, neurohormonal activation, inflammatory mediators, and endothelial dysfunction, all contributing to progressive organ injury. Cardiorenal syndrome is commonly associated with conditions such as heart failure, chronic kidney disease (CKD), acute kidney injury (AKI), and systemic hypertension.

Management of CRS primarily focuses on addressing the underlying cause while mitigating the complications associated with the syndrome. Since volume overload is a predominant feature in most patients, treatment typically involves fluid removal, primarily through loop diuretics, with thiazides as adjuncts for diuretic resistant cases. Ultrafiltration is reserved for refractory cases. Depending on the case, additional therapies such as ACE inhibitors, angiotensin II receptor blockers, mineralocorticoid receptor antagonists, and inotropes may be utilized. Despite available treatments, CRS remains associated with high morbidity and mortality.

== Signs and symptoms ==
Cardiorenal syndrome (CRS) encompasses a spectrum of disorders in which acute or chronic dysfunction in the heart or kidneys leads to dysfunction in the other organ. Therefore, the clinical signs and symptoms are consistent with congestive heart failure and chronic kidney disease. The clinical presentation of most patients typically involves fluid overload, reduced cardiac output, and worsening renal function. Patients with acute cardiorenal syndrome often present with clinical features of pulmonary or systemic congestion and acute kidney injury.

Symptoms of peripheral edema and shortness of breath are common both in patients with CHF and CKD or a combination thereof. Patients will frequently exhibit signs of acute decompensated heart failure, such as volume overload characterized by peripheral edema, pulmonary congestion, jugular venous distension, and shortness of breath. Prolonged effects of heart failure, such as fatigue and exercise intolerance, may also be present.

Symptoms of acute cardiorenal syndrome also often present with classic indicators of renal dysfunction. Increased serum levels of creatinine and BUN, as well as reduced urine production may indicate worsening renal function.

== Risk factors ==
The primary risk factors for the development of cardiorenal syndrome are pre-existing cardiac or renal disease. The following risk factors have been associated with increased incidence of CRS.

Clinical:

- Older age
- Comorbid conditions (diabetes mellitus, uncontrolled hypertension, anemia)
- Drugs (anti-inflammatory agents, diuretics, ACE inhibitors, ARBs)

Heart:

- History of heart failure with impaired left ventricular ejection fraction
- Prior myocardial infarction
- Elevated New York Heart Association (NYHA) functional class
- Elevated cardiac troponins

Kidney:

- Chronic kidney disease (reduced eGFR, elevated BUN, creatinine, or cystatin)

== Pathophysiology ==
Cardiorenal syndrome (CRS) pathophysiology involves a complex bidirectional interaction between the heart and kidneys. The underlying mechanisms are broadly categorized into hemodynamic and non-hemodynamic factors. Hemodynamic factors primarily include changes in blood flow, such as reduced cardiac output and elevated central venous or intra-abdominal pressures. Non-hemodynamic factors include neurohormonal activation, oxidative stress, and systemic inflammation. These mechanisms often act synergistically, contributing to the progressive dysfunction of both organs.

=== Hemodynamic factors ===
Reduced cardiac output, commonly due to heart failure or other cardiovascular conditions, leads to decreased renal perfusion. Historically, this reduction in perfusion was considered the primary driver of kidney dysfunction in heart failure. However, recent studies suggest that venous congestion may play an even more critical role. Heart failure increases central venous and intra-abdominal pressures, which are important regulators of renal blood flow. Elevated venous pressures reduce the net glomerular filtration pressure, promoting renal injury. These changes contribute to worsening volume overload and further deterioration of cardiac and renal function.

The renin-angiotensin-aldosterone system (RAAS) is activated in response to reduced renal perfusion. Although RAAS normally helps maintain blood pressure and organ perfusion, chronic over-activation leads to inappropriate sodium and water retention. This exacerbates volume overload and perpetuates a cycle of worsening heart and kidney function.

=== Non-hemodynamic factors ===
In addition to hemodynamic changes, several non-hemodynamic mechanisms contribute to the progression of CRS. These include neurohormonal activation, oxidative stress, and systemic inflammation, all of which are associated with structural and functional deterioration in both the heart and kidneys.

Neurohormonal systems, primarily the RAAS and sympathetic nervous system (SNS), are activated in response to reduced renal perfusion. In heart failure, these systems become over-activated, causing peripheral vasoconstriction and extracellular fluid retention. Beyond hemodynamic effects, RAAS and SNS activation stimulate oxidative and inflammatory pathways and contribute to cardiac remodeling and progressive dysfunction.

Oxidative stress and inflammation also play critical roles. Elevated levels of reactive oxygen species (ROS), endothelin, and arginine vasopressin contribute to endothelial dysfunction, myocardial hypertrophy, and fibrosis, as well as to renal tubular injury and glomerular dysfunction. An imbalance between nitric oxide and ROS exacerbates endothelial dysfunction and impairs organ perfusion. There is a close interaction within these cardio-renal connectors as well as between these factors and the hemodynamic factors which makes the study of CRS pathophysiology complicated.

== Diagnosis ==
Diagnosing cardiorenal syndrome (CRS) is challenging due to the complex and interconnected nature of cardiac and renal dysfunction. It is critical to diagnose CRS at an early stage in order to achieve optimal therapeutic efficacy. There is no specific test to diagnose cardiorenal syndrome. Instead, diagnosis relies on clinical evaluation, laboratory data, and imaging, often in the context of known heart failure, kidney disease, or both. The diagnosis of heart failure requires the presence of clinical signs and symptoms supported by evidence of a structural or functional cardiac abnormality. This diagnostic requirement for cardiorenal syndrome includes similar evidence for both the heart and kidneys.

=== Cardiac Biomarkers ===
Cardiac biomarkers can help to identify cardiac dysfunction in the evaluation for Cardiorenal syndrome. Brain-naturetic peptide (BNP) is a peptide that is elevated in the presence of cardiac stress and volume overload. Cardiac troponin is a biomarker that can be useful to indicate ongoing myocardial damage and stress. The use of BNP and troponin can be confounded by decreased renal clearance in patients with chronic kidney function. Despite the limitations, these biomarkers can help to identify cardiac dysfunction crucial to the diagnosis of CRS. Though less frequently used in clinical practice, Galectin-3 and ST2 (suppressor of tumorigenicity 2), markers of fibrosis and myocardial stress, can add prognostic value.

=== Renal Biomarkers ===
Unlike markers of heart damage or stress such as troponin, creatine kinase, natriuretic peptides, reliable markers for acute kidney injury are lacking. Recently, research has found several biomarkers that can be used for early detection of acute kidney injury before serious loss of organ function may occur. Several of these biomarkers include neutrophil gelatinase-associated lipocalin (NGAL), N-acetyl-B-D-glucosaminidase (NAG), Cystatin C, and kidney injury molecule-1 (KIM-1) which have been shown to be involved in tubular damage. Other biomarkers that have been shown to be useful include BNP, IL-18, and fatty acid binding protein (FABP). However, there is great variability in the measurement of these biomarkers and their use in diagnosing CRS must be assessed.

=== Non-Invasive Imaging ===
The diagnosis of Cardiorenal syndrome utilizes imaging to provide key insights into structural and functional changes in the heart and kidneys. Echocardiography is the primary tool to assess heart function and can provide data on heart chamber performance, valvular abnormalities, and estimates of filling pressures. Lung ultrasound has recently emerged as a commonly used bedside tool to identify pulmonary edema. Imaging of the kidneys is commonly performed using ultrasound to assess size, structural changes, and perfusion.

== Classification ==
Ronco et al. first proposed a five-part classification system for CRS in 2008 which was also accepted at ADQI consensus conference in 2010. These include:

Type	Inciting event	Secondary disturbance	Example
Type 1 (acute CRS)	Abrupt worsening of heart function	kidney injury	acute cardiogenic shock or acute decompensation of chronic heart failure
Type 2 (chronic CRS)	Chronic abnormalities in heart function	progressive chronic kidney disease	chronic heart failure
Type 3 (acute renocardiac syndrome)	Abrupt worsening of kidney function	acute cardiac disorder (e.g. heart failure, abnormal heart rhythm, or pulmonary edema)	acute kidney failure or glomerulonephritis
Type 4 (chronic renocardiac syndrome)	Chronic kidney disease	decreased cardiac function, cardiac hypertrophy and/or increased risk of adverse cardiovascular events	chronic glomerular disease
Type 5 (secondary CRS)	Systemic condition	both heart and kidney dysfunction	diabetes mellitus, sepsis, lupus

=== Type 1: Acute cardio-renal syndrome ===
Acute cardiorenal syndrome occurs in patients who experience an abrupt decrease in cardiac function, causing an acute kidney injury and/or dysfunction. The sudden reduction in kidney function is frequently caused by acute decompensated heart failure, acute coronary syndrome, cardiogenic shock, and/or low flow syndrome following cardiac surgery. The extent of renal injury can vary, often causing acute kidney injury (AKI), but it can also result in acute renal failure. Type 1 CRS carries the risk of advancing to more severe stages of chronic kidney disease and end-stage renal disease (ESRD).

=== Type 2: Chronic cardio-renal syndrome ===
Type 2 CRS refers to the specific situation in which chronic heart dysfunction results in progressive kidney dysfunction. Cardiac conditions such as heart failure with reduced or preserved ejection fraction, atrial fibrillation, ischemic cardiomyopathy, and congenital heart disease can result in adaptive changes in renal perfusion and neurohormonal activation over time. These conditions cause a time-dependent and progressive decline in renal function.

The distinction between CRS type 2 and CRS type 4 is based on the assumption that, also in advanced and chronic disease, two different pathophysiological mechanisms can be distinguished, whereas both CKD and HF often develop due to a common pathophysiological background, most notably hypertension and diabetes mellitus. Furthermore, the feasibility of the distinction between CRS type 2 and 4 in terms of diagnosis can be questioned.

=== Type 3: Acute reno-cardiac syndrome ===
Type 3 CRS involves a abrupt decrease in renal function resulting in an acute cardiac disorder. An example of type 3 CRS would be the development of acute heart failure, acute coronary syndrome or arrhythmia following the onset of an AKI, or intrinsic kidney disease. Drug-induced renal disease, rhabdomyolysis, and acute nephritic syndromes have been associated with Type 3 CRS.

=== Type 4: Chronic reno-cardiac syndrome ===
Type 4 cardiorenal syndrome is the development of chronic heart dysfunction as a result of chronic kidney disease. Many studies have found increased rates of cardiovascular disease in patients with CKD, that occur in a dose-dependent relationship, with the greatest reductions in GFR resulting in the greatest risk for CVD development. The data from scientific literature indicates that CKD increases the risk for developing heart disease.

=== Type 5: Secondary cardiorenal syndrome ===
This subtype of CRS refers to a separate condition resulting in simultaneous cardiac and renal systems dysfunction. These cases often involve a systemic illness such as sepsis, multiple traumas, amyloidosis, sarcoidosis, diabetes mellitus, hepatitis b, hepatitis c, systemic lupus erythematosus (SLE), and significant burns, causing an abrupt decrease in both cardiac and renal function.[1] Type 5 CRS can also be the result of the administration of chemotherapy medications and the use of illicit substances such as heroin and cocaine.

Braam et al. argue that classifying the CRS based on the order in which the organs are affected and the timeframe (acute vs chronic) is too simplistic and without a mechanistic classification it is difficult to study CRS. They view the cardiorenal syndrome in a more holistic, integrative manner. They defined the cardiorenal syndrome as a pathophysiological condition in which combined heart and kidney dysfunction amplifies progression of failure of the individual organ, by inducing similar pathophysiological mechanisms. Therefore, regardless of which organ fails first, the same neurohormonal systems are activated causing accelerated cardiovascular disease, and progression of damage and failure of both organs. These systems are broken down into two broad categories of "hemodynamic factors" and non-hemodynamic factors or "cardiorenal connectors".

== Management ==
Medical management of patients with CRS is often challenging as the treatment of one organ system may adversely affect the other. Many of the medications used to treat heart failure may worsen kidney function. Chronic kidney disease has been shown to have an adverse effect on morbidity and mortality in patients with heart failure. Many of the most impactful clinical trials regarding heart failure management have excluded patients with significant renal impairment, limiting the understanding of treatment in cardiorenal syndrome. The management of cardiorenal syndrome will vary depending on the subtype, as well as individual patient considerations.

Patients with kidney failure are less likely to get all guideline-based therapies. Patients who have moderate to severe CKD was seen to have similar care when compared to those patients who had normal kidney function. This helps show how healthcare workers can do more to increase the outcome of those suffering.

=== Diuretics ===
Diuretics play a crucial role in managing fluid overload in patients with acute heart failure, with or without CRS. Although not supported by data from large clinical trials like other heart failure treatments, the clinical best practices regarding diuretics remain uncertain. Diuretics are widely considered a standard of care to reduce volume overload caused by acute heart failure based on expert opinion alone. Guidelines recommend using diuretics cautiously by using minimal required dosing and close monitoring in patients with kidney disease, as they may potentially cause dehydration and worsening renal function. Loop diuretics are the primary agents used in heart failure. Diuretic resistance is frequently a challenge for physicians to overcome which they may tackle by changing the dosage, frequency, or adding a second drug.

=== ACE Inhibitors, Angiotensin II receptor blockers (ARB) ===
The use of ACE inhibitors have long term protective effect on kidney and heart tissue. Angiotensin inhibition with an ACE inhibitor or angiotensin II receptor blocker (ARB) is a standard part of treatment for heart failure. The use of Ace inhibitors and ARBs in heart failure has been shown to improve survival and reduce kidney dysfunction.However, they should be used with caution in patients with CRS and kidney failure. Although patients with kidney failure may experience slight deterioration of kidney function in the short term, the use of ACE inhibitors is shown to have prognostic benefit over the long term. Two studies have suggested that the use of ACEI alongside statins might be an effective regimen to prevent a substantial number of CRS cases in high risk patients and improve survival and quality of life in these people. There are data suggesting combined use of statin and an ACEI improves clinical outcome more than a statin alone and considerably more than ACE inhibitor alone.

=== Angiotensin receptor neprilysin inhibitors (ARNI) ===
Recently, a new class of drugs for the treatment of chronic heart failure, angiotensin receptor neprilysin inhibitors (ARNI), has emerged as an alternative to ACE inhibitors and ARBs. This drug class has the effects of an ARB, blocking the effects of angiotensin II, combined with the inhibition of the enzyme neprilysin, which prevents the breakdown of natriuretic peptides. Clinical studies have shown the clinical benefits of ARNIs in patients with heart failure and chronic kidney disease, supporting their use. The guidelines regarding the clinical use of ARNIs in cardiorenal syndrome are still evolving.

=== Sodium-glucose cotransporter 2 (SGLT2) Inhibitors ===
Sodium-glucose cotransporter 2 (SGLT2) inhibitors are medications commonly used in regimens for treating heart failure and preserving renal function. SGLT2 inhibitors function to block glucose reabsorption in the kidney. These agents have demonstrated cardiovascular and renal protective benefits, such as reducing volume overload and preventing kidney damage caused by inflammation and oxidative stress.

=== Mineralocorticoid Receptor Antagonists (MRA) ===
Treatment with an ACE inhibitor or ARB may not sufficiently suppress the RAAS system in the long term. Mineralocorticoid receptor antagonists may be added to the regimen to provide additional RAAS suppression, resulting in more significant long-erm cardiorenal benefits.

=== Beta-adrenergic blockers ===
Beta-blockers are commonly used in guideline-directer heart failure medication regimens and may also be used in the treatment of cardiorenal syndrome. By blocking the effects of epinephrine, beta-blockers reduce blood pressure and significantly improve mortality and hospitalization rates in patients with heart failure and chronic kidney disease.

=== Ultrafiltration ===
Ultrafiltration involves the removal of fluid from the venous system via filtration, in a process similar to dialysis. Ultrafiltration is generally reserved for patients in acute decompensated heart failure that have volume overload resistant to diuretics. Many case reports have shown improved kidney function with ultrafiltration, however the clinical value has yet to be established.

=== Inotropes ===
Inotropes are a class of drugs that enhance the contractile force produced by the heart and the overall cardiac output. Due to their mechanism, they have the potential to treat cardiorenal syndrome by improving heart function and reducing venous congestion. However, the efficacy of inotropes as a long-term therapy has yet to be proven. They may be used in patients with cardiorenal syndrome in the instance of cardiogenic shock.

=== Cardiac Resynchronization Therapy (CRT) ===
CRT, a form of cardiac pacing, helps to improve heart function by electrically activating the ventricles to synchronize their contractions. CRT has been shown to improve renal response in patients with chronic kidney disease and congestive heart failure.

== Epidemiology ==
Kidney failure is very common in patients with congestive heart failure. It was shown that kidney failure complicates one-third of all admissions for heart failure, which is the leading cause of hospitalization in the United States among adults over 65 years old. Not only is this the leading cause of hospitalization, it also increases the stays in the ICU. These complications led to longer hospital stay, higher mortality, and greater chance for readmission. The inpatient mortality was seen to be much higher for patients with much more sever renal dysfunction. The increase of hospital and ICU stays also increases the cost of care in the hospital. Not only are there patients suffering from their disease, they are also suffering financially due to the cost of the hospital stays. Another study found that 39% of patients in NYHA class 4 and 31% of patients in NYHA class 3 had severely impaired kidney function. Similarly, kidney failure can have deleterious effects on cardiovascular function. It was estimated that about 44% of deaths in patients with end-stage kidney failure (ESKF) are due to cardiovascular disease.

== See also ==
- Cardiovascular–kidney–metabolic syndrome
