= CKM (gene) =

Protein and coding gene in humans

Identifiers
- Aliases: CKM, CKMM, M-CK, creatine kinase, M-type, CPK-M
- External IDs: OMIM: 123310; MGI: 88413; GeneCards: CKM
Available structures
PDB	Ortholog search: PDBe RCSB
PDB	List of PDB id codes 1I0E
Enzyme activity
EC #	BRENDA	ExPASy	KEGG	MetaCyc
2.7.3.2	↗	↗	↗	↗

Gene location (Human)
Chr.	Chromosome 19 (human)
Band	19q13.32	Start	45,306,413 bp
Band	19q13.32	End	45,322,875 bp

Gene location (Mouse)
Chr.	Chromosome 7 (mouse)
Band	7 A3|7 9.67 cM	Start	19,138,701 bp
Band	7 A3|7 9.67 cM	End	19,156,766 bp
RNA expression pattern
Bgee	Human / Mouse (ortholog); Top expressed in: Skeletal muscle tissue of rectus abdominis; thoracic diaphragm; Skeletal muscle tissue of biceps brachii; triceps brachii muscle; gastrocnemius muscle; deltoid muscle; muscle of thigh; glutes; right ventricle; myocardium of left ventricle / Top expressed in: digastric muscle; muscle of thigh; ankle; sternocleidomastoid muscle; medial head of gastrocnemius muscle; vastus lateralis muscle; skeletal muscle tissue; extraocular muscle; temporal muscle; triceps brachii muscle; More reference expression data
BioGPS	n/a
Gene ontology
Molecular function	transferase activity; creatine kinase activity; transferase activity, transferring phosphorus-containing groups; nucleotide binding; catalytic activity; protein binding; ATP binding; kinase activity
Cellular component	cytoplasm; cytosol; extracellular space
Biological process	creatine metabolic process; phosphocreatine biosynthetic process; phosphorylation
Sources:Amigo / QuickGO
Orthologs
Databases	NCBI: entry; OMA: entry
Species	Human	Mouse
Entrez	1158	12715
Ensembl	ENSG00000104879	ENSMUSG00000030399
UniProt	P06732	P07310
RefSeq (mRNA)	NM_001824	NM_007710
RefSeq (protein)	NP_001815	NP_031736
Location (UCSC)	Chr 19: 45.31 – 45.32 Mb	Chr 7: 19.14 – 19.16 Mb
PubMed search
- Wikidata
View/Edit Human	View/Edit Mouse

Creatine kinase, muscle also known as MCK, CKMM, M-CK, and CPK-M, is a creatine kinase that in humans is encoded by the MCK gene.

== Structure ==
In the figure to the right, the crystal structure of the muscle-type M-CK monomer is shown. In vivo, two such monomers arrange symmetrically to form the active MM-CK enzyme.

== Function ==
The protein encoded by this gene is a cytoplasmic enzyme involved in cellular energy homeostasis. The encoded protein reversibly catalyzes the transfer of "energy-rich" phosphate between ATP and creatine and between phosphocreatine and ADP. Its functional entity is a MM-CK homodimer in striated (sarcomeric) skeletal and cardiac muscle.

== Clinical significance ==
In heart, in addition to the MM-CK homodimer, also the heterodimer MB-CK consisting of one muscle (M-CK) and one brain-type (B-CK) subunit is expressed. The latter may be an important serum marker for myocardial infarction, if released from damaged myocardial cells into the blood where it can be detected by clinical chemistry.
