= CKMT1A =

Protein and coding gene in humans

Identifiers
- Aliases: CKMT1A, CKMT1, U-MtCK, mia-CK, creatine kinase, mitochondrial 1A
- External IDs: OMIM: 613415; MGI: 99441; GeneCards: CKMT1A
Available structures
PDB	Ortholog search: PDBe RCSB
PDB	List of PDB id codes 1QK1
Enzyme activity
EC #	BRENDA	ExPASy	KEGG	MetaCyc
2.7.3.2	↗	↗	↗	↗

Gene location (Human)
Chr.	Chromosome 15 (human)
Band	15q15.3	Start	43,692,886 bp
Band	15q15.3	End	43,699,222 bp

Gene location (Mouse)
Chr.	Chromosome 2 (mouse)
Band	2 E5|2 60.37 cM	Start	121,188,195 bp
Band	2 E5|2 60.37 cM	End	121,194,218 bp
RNA expression pattern
Bgee	Human / Mouse (ortholog); Top expressed in: right hemisphere of cerebellum; mucosa of transverse colon; superior frontal gyrus; duodenum; rectum; primary visual cortex; mucosa of esophagus; Brodmann area 9; right frontal lobe; prefrontal cortex / Top expressed in: left colon; epithelium of stomach; duodenum; mucous cell of stomach; molar; medial vestibular nucleus; ileum; pyloric antrum; facial motor nucleus; pontine nuclei; More reference expression data
BioGPS	n/a
Gene ontology
Molecular function	transferase activity; creatine kinase activity; nucleotide binding; transferase activity, transferring phosphorus-containing groups; catalytic activity; ATP binding; kinase activity
Cellular component	mitochondrial inner membrane; membrane; mitochondrion
Biological process	creatine metabolic process; phosphorylation; phosphocreatine biosynthetic process
Sources:Amigo / QuickGO
Orthologs
Databases	NCBI: entry; OMA: entry
Species	Human	Mouse
Entrez	548596	12716
Ensembl	ENSG00000223572	ENSMUSG00000000308
UniProt	P12532	P30275
RefSeq (mRNA)	NM_001015001; NM_001321926; NM_001321927; NM_001321928; NM_001321929	NM_009897; NM_001355069
RefSeq (protein)	NP_001015001; NP_001308855; NP_001308856; NP_001308857; NP_001308858 NP_001362413; NP_066270	NP_034027; NP_001341998
Location (UCSC)	Chr 15: 43.69 – 43.7 Mb	Chr 2: 121.19 – 121.19 Mb
PubMed search
- Wikidata
View/Edit Human	View/Edit Mouse

Creatine kinase U-type, mitochondrial, also called ubiquitous mitochondrial creatine kinase (uMtCK), is a protein that in humans encoded by CKMT1A gene. The nearby paralog, CKMT1B, encodes an identical (or nearly identical) protein, which currently (Note: September 2026) shares a UniProt ID.

CKMT1A catalyzes the reversible transfer of the γ-phosphate group of ATP to the guanidino group of Cr to yield ADP and PCr. The impairment of CKMT1A has been reported in ischaemia, cardiomyopathy, and neurodegenerative disorders. Overexpression of CKMT1A has been reported related with several tumors.

== Structure ==
=== Gene ===
The CKMT1A gene lies on the chromosome location of 15q15.3 and consists of 11 exons.

=== Protein ===
CKMT1A consists of 417 amino acids and weighs 47037Da. CKMT1A is rich in amino acids with hydroxyl-containing and basic side chains.

== Function ==
There are four distinct types of CK subunits in the tissue of mammals, which are expressed species specifically, developmental stage specifically, and tissue specifically. Ubiquitously expressed, CKMT1A is located in the mitochondrial intermembrane space and form both homodimeric and homooctameric molecules that are readily interconvertible. Like all the other CK isoenzymes, CKMT1A catalyzes the reversible transfer of the γ-phosphate group of ATP to the guanidino group of Cr to yield ADP and PCr. According to the “transport” (“shuttle”) hypothesis for the CK system, after synthesis within the mitochondrial matrix, the γ-phosphate group of ATP is transferred by CKMT1A in the mitochondrial intermembrane space to Cr to yield ADP plus PCr.

== Clinical significance ==
As an enzyme central to cell energetics, CKMT1A is often impaired in pathological situations. CKMT1A is known as a primary target of oxidative and radical-induced molecular damage; and the impairment of CKMT1A has been reported in ischaemia, cardiomyopathy, and neurodegenerative disorders due to the failure in maintaining metabolic homeostasis. Overexpression of uMtCK has been reported for several tumors with poor prognosis and this may be the adaption of cancer cells to maintain the high growth rate.

== Interactions ==
- Leucine-rich repeat kinase
- ASB9
