= Cardiovascular–kidney–metabolic syndrome =

- Other names: CKM syndrome
- Specialty: Cardiology; Endocrinology; Nephrology
- Prevention: Life-style changes

Cardiovascular–kidney–metabolic syndrome (CKM syndrome) is a multisystem disorder of the metabolic, renal and cardiovascular systems. (The term CKM syndrome was first introduced by the American Heart Association in 2023.) This syndrome is the result of interactions between metabolic risk factors, e.g., prediabetes, type 2 diabetes, insulin resistance in normally insulin-sensitive tissues, systemic inflammation, metabolic dysfunction–associated steatotic liver disease (i.e., non-alcoholic fatty liver disease due to the accumulation of excessive fat levels in the liver), dyslipidemia, and obesity. Acting alone or interacting with each other, these abnormalities can promote chronic kidney and cardiovascular disorders and thereby lead to increases in morbidity and mortality rates.

== Staging ==
The CKM syndrome is defined as having the stages listed in the following table. The table also gives the relative mortality rates of Stages 1 to 4 compared to stage 0 based on the study of 97,777 Chinese patients over a medium follow-up time of 15 years. The study found that there was a highly significant (p<0.001) increased mortality (causes not specified) with increasing stages of disease.

Stage	CKM findings	Mortality Rate
Stage 0	Absence of the CKM syndrome, i.e., an individual has a normal body weight, no evidence of the metabolic syndrome (i.e., abdominal obesity, high blood pressure, high blood sugar, high serum triglycerides and/or low high-density lipoprotein), no chronic kidney disease, and no clinical or subclinical cardiovascular disease	Baseline
Stage1	Obesity, overweight, hyperlipidemia, insulin resistance, and/or prediabetes but no evidence of organ damage, chronic kidney disease, cardiovascular disease, or other risk factors	1.24-fold increase over baseline
Stage 2	Evidence of subclinical kidney injury such as albuminuria (i.e., albumin in the urine) and/or slightly reduced glomerular filtration rate), endothelial dysfunction (i.e., poor functioning the cells lining blood vessels), and/or remodeling of the heart's left ventricle	1.74-fold increase over baseline
Stage 3	Chronic kidney disease as manifested by moderate-to-severe renal impairment and/or chronic cardiovascular disease as manifested by atherosclerosis (i.e., atheromatous plaques in the walls of arteries) or overt congestive heart failure	2.58-fold increase over baseline
Stage 4	End stage chronic kidney disease (i.e., kidneys that have lost about 90% of their function), severe congestive heart failure, and/or recurrent major adverse cardiovascular events such as nonfatal brain strokes, nonfatal myocardial infarction, and deaths due to adverse cardiovascular events.	3.73-fold increase over baseline
Stage 4a	Stage 4 without kidney failure	Not reported
Stage 4b	Stage 4 with kidney failure	Not reported

== Diagnostic criteria ==
It is critical to define and treat the CKM syndrome at early stages (i.e., stages 1 and 2) in order to prevent patients from developing the later stages (i.e., stages 3 and 4) which involve serious or irreversible damages to their kidneys and cardiovascular systems. The "ABCDE" method has been developed to define the potential severity of individuals with the CKM syndrome at stages 1 or 2. "A" stands for albuminuria, i.e., elevated levels of albumen in the urine and therefore at least some damage to the kidneys. "B" stands for blood pressures which if found to be elevated indicate either the future development of damage to the cardiovascular system or the presence of overt cardiovascular disease. "C" stands for high blood levels of cholesterol (particularly the cholesterol carried by low density lipoproteins) which can promote the development of or further injury to the cardiovascular system and kidneys.https://www.webmd.com/cholesterol-management/high-cholesterol-and-kidney-disease "D" stands for diabetes Mellitus: a study conducted in China on 3,410 patients found that type 2 diabetes mellitus, i.e., adult-onset diabetes mellitus, was strongly associated with advanced stages of the CKM syndrome. The presence of diabetes mellitus or prediabetes is associated with cardiovascular disease. "E" stands for estimated glomerular filtration rate, i.e., a measurement of the kidney function which can be used to measure the kidney's function at early stages of disease.

== Treatment ==
=== Lifestyle interventions ===
Individuals with all stages of the CKM syndrome have reduced chances of entering or progressing to stages 1 to 4 using lifestyle interventions. These interventions include eating a healthy diet, health-promoting physical activity (e.g., doing at leaset 150 minutes/week of aerobic exercise plus 2-3 strength trainings), and dietary-based weight loose including bariatric surgery if dietary methods do not reduce bodily weight.

=== Pharmacologic interventions ===
Stage 0: none; Stage 1 with excessive or dysfunctional body fat: metformin or GLP-1 receptor agonists; Stage 2: renin-angiotensin-aldosterone system inhibiters, e.g., angiotensin-converting enzyme inhibitor, angiotensin receptor blockers, and mineralocorticoid receptor antagonists; Stage 3: same as Stage 2 plus or minus SGLT2 inhibitors (i.e., sodium-glucose co-transporter 2 inhibitors), Glucagon-like peptide-1 receptor agonists, and if the inflammation of tissues is involved, anti-inflammatory agents; Stage 4: same as Stage 4 plus or minus statins, Immunomodulators, anticoagulants, and for significant cardiac arrhythmias (i.e., irregularities) in the heartbeat implantable cardioverter-defibrillators, for advanced heart failure due to a weakened heart as ventricular assist device, and for kidney failure either kidney dialysis or a kidney transplant.

== Age-related prevalence ==
A study of 231,590,853 individuals living in the USA found older aged patients trended to have higher stages of the CKM syndrome. In the 20-44 years old age group 17.3% were stage 0, 37.6% were stage 1, 43.2% % were stage 2, 0.2% were stage 3, and 1.7% were stage 4. In the 45 to 64 years old group, 5.4% were stage 0, 21.0% were stage 1, 63.8% were stage 2, 1.2 % were stage 3, and 8.6% were stage 4. In the 65 years and older age group, 1.8% were stage 0, 8.4% were stag 1, 39.0% were stage 2, 24.6% were stage 3, and 26.2% were stage 4. The 20 to 44, 45 to 64, and 65 or greater years old groups consisted respectively of 104,113,793, 82,640,261, and 44,836,799 individuals.

== History ==
A link between the heart and kidneys has been mentioned in ancient Egypt.

== See also ==
- Cardiorenal syndrome
- Overlap syndrome
