= Intramuscular coordination =

Intramuscular coordination or neuromuscular coordination describes the interaction in between the nervous system and muscle. The intramuscular coordination defines the number of muscular fibres that can be controlled synchronously by the nervous system within a certain muscle. Thereby IC determines maximum strength, independent from muscular hypertrophia.

== Role ==
IC aims at synchronous activation of a large number of fibres within a certain muscle. Training of IC is recommended for athletes heading towards increasing maximum available power without growth of muscular mass. The use of available muscular mass will be used more effective. That aspect is relevant for endurance athletes such as triathlon, long distance runners, as well as martial arts. Both groups profit of increased strength without increased body mass, which results from hypertrophic exercise. Furthermore, IC methods are used within high jump, shot put and Olympic weight lifting.

== Methods of exercise ==
Within intramuscular exercise athletes focus on achieving highest recruiting and frequenting of muscular fibres. Cyclic periodised athletes work, referring to literature, in between 6 and 8 weeks in IC. Stress intensity shall be in between 85 and 100% of highest mass, movable by the athlete within one repetition. 1 to 3 repetitions per series are recommended. The number of series shall be in between 3 and 6. High, up to full, recovery in between series shall be guaranteed. Current authors advise the athlete to intend explosive development of power, within slow movement. We shall mention theses advises concern classical strengthening exercise working with isolated drills. IC methods can improve fast power given the fact that parts of movement take below 200ms.
