= CKB (gene) =

Protein and coding gene in humans

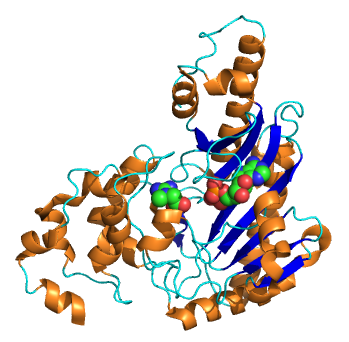

Identifiers
- Aliases: CKB, B-CK, BCK, CKBB, HEL-211, HEL-S-29, creatine kinase B, CPK-B
- External IDs: OMIM: 123280; MGI: 88407; GeneCards: CKB
Available structures
PDB	Ortholog search: PDBe RCSB
PDB	List of PDB id codes 3B6R, 3DRB, 3DRE
Enzyme activity
EC #	BRENDA	ExPASy	KEGG	MetaCyc
2.7.3.2	↗	↗	↗	↗

Gene location (Human)
Chr.	Chromosome 14 (human)
Band	14q32.33	Start	103,519,667 bp
Band	14q32.33	End	103,522,833 bp

Gene location (Mouse)
Chr.	Chromosome 12 (mouse)
Band	12 F1|12 61.09 cM	Start	111,635,795 bp
Band	12 F1|12 61.09 cM	End	111,638,772 bp
RNA expression pattern
Bgee	Human / Mouse (ortholog); Top expressed in: right hemisphere of cerebellum; ventricular zone; right frontal lobe; prefrontal cortex; caudate nucleus; nucleus accumbens; muscle layer of sigmoid colon; amygdala; cingulate gyrus; anterior cingulate cortex / Top expressed in: cerebellar cortex; olfactory bulb; Cortex of frontal lobe; superior frontal gyrus; striatum of neuraxis; primary visual cortex; neural tube; mesencephalon; hypothalamus; hippocampus proper; More reference expression data
BioGPS	n/a
Gene ontology
Molecular function	transferase activity; nucleotide binding; transferase activity, transferring phosphorus-containing groups; kinase activity; creatine kinase activity; catalytic activity; protein binding; ATP binding; ubiquitin protein ligase binding
Cellular component	myelin sheath; mitochondrion; extracellular exosome; extracellular space; nucleus; cytoplasm; cytosol; dendrite; soma
Biological process	substantia nigra development; phosphorylation; brain development; creatine metabolic process; cellular chloride ion homeostasis; cerebellum development; phosphocreatine biosynthetic process
Sources:Amigo / QuickGO
Orthologs
Databases	NCBI: entry; OMA: entry
Species	Human	Mouse
Entrez	1152	12709
Ensembl	ENSG00000166165	ENSMUSG00000001270
UniProt	P12277	Q04447
RefSeq (mRNA)	NM_001823; NM_001362531	NM_021273
RefSeq (protein)	NP_001814; NP_001349460	NP_067248
Location (UCSC)	Chr 14: 103.52 – 103.52 Mb	Chr 12: 111.64 – 111.64 Mb
PubMed search
- Wikidata
View/Edit Human	View/Edit Mouse

creatine kinase, ectopic expression

Identifiers
- Symbol: CKBE
- NCBI gene: 1156
- HGNC: 1992
- OMIM: 123270

Other data
- Locus: Chr. 14 q32.3

Brain-type creatine kinase also known as CK-BB is a creatine kinase that in humans is encoded by the CKB gene.

== Function ==
The protein encoded by this gene, CK-BB, consists of a homodimer of two identical brain-type CK-B subunits. BB-CK is a cytoplasmic enzyme involved in cellular energy homeostasis, with certain fractions of the enzyme being bound to cell membranes, ATPases, and a variety of ATP-requiring enzymes in the cell. There, CK-BB forms tightly coupled microcompartments for in situ regeneration of ATP that has been used up. The encoded protein reversibly catalyzes the transfer of "energy-rich" phosphate between ATP and creatine or between phospho-creatine (PCr) and ADP. Its functional entity is a homodimer (CK-BB) in brain and smooth muscle as well as in other tissues and cells such as neuronal cells, retina, kidney, bone, etc. In heart, a heterodimer (CK-MB) consisting of one CK-B brain-type CK subunit and one CK-M muscle-type CK subunit is prominently expressed. The encoded CK-BB and CK-MB proteins are members of the ATP:guanido phosphotransferase protein family.

== Ectopic expression ==
Ectopic expression (CKBE) of the B (brain) type of creatine kinase (CK-BB) in red cells and platelets is a rare, benign anomaly detected during a newborn screening program for Duchenne muscular dystrophy.
