= Phosphocreatine =

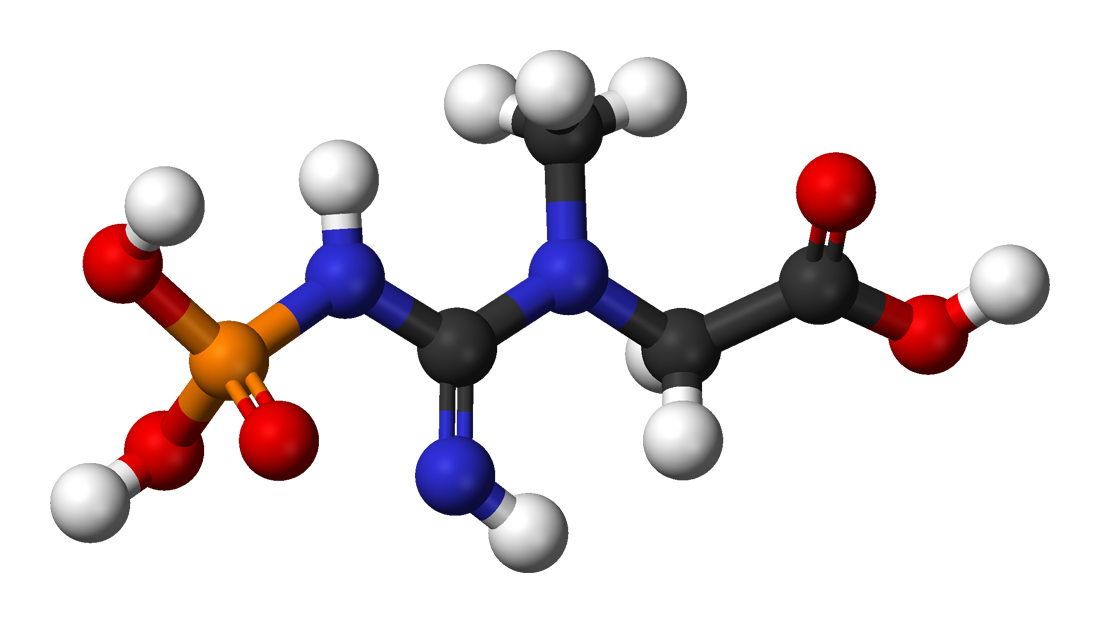

Names
- IUPAC name N-Methyl-N-(phosphonocarbamimidoyl)glycine
- Other names Creatine phosphate; phosphorylcreatine; creatine-P; phosphagen; fosfocreatine

Identifiers
CAS Number	67-07-2
3D model (JSmol)	Interactive image; Interactive image
Abbreviations	PCr
Beilstein Reference	1797096
ChEBI	CHEBI:17287
ChEMBL	ChEMBL1204644
ChemSpider	567
DrugBank	DB13191
ECHA InfoCard	100.000.585
EC Number	200-643-9
KEGG	C02305 =
PubChem CID	587
UNII	020IUV4N33
CompTox Dashboard (EPA)	DTXSID0058776
- InChI: InChI=1S/C4H10N3O5P/c1-7(2-3(8)9)4(5)6-13(10,11)12/h2H2,1H3,(H,8,9)(H4,5,6,10,11,12) Key: DRBBFCLWYRJSJZ-UHFFFAOYSA-N; InChI=1/C4H10N3O5P/c1-7(2-3(8)9)4(5)6-13(10,11)12/h2H2,1H3,(H,8,9)(H4,5,6,10,11,12) Key: DRBBFCLWYRJSJZ-UHFFFAOYAF
- SMILES: OC(CN(C)C(N)=NP(O)(O)=O)=O; CN(CC(=O)O)C(=N)NP(=O)(O)O

Properties
Chemical formula	C_{4}H_{10}N_{3}O_{5}P
Molar mass	211.114 g·mol^{−1}

Pharmacology
ATC code	C01EB06 (WHO)

Hazards
- GHS labelling
Pictograms	(GHS07: Exclamation mark)
Signal word	Warning
Hazard statements	H315, H319, H335
Precautionary statements	P261, P264, P271, P280, P302+P352, P304+P340, P305+P351+P338, P312, P321, P332+P313, P337+P313, P362, P403+P233, P405, P501
- Except where otherwise noted, data are given for materials in their standard state (at 25 °C [77 °F], 100 kPa). verify (what is ?) Infobox references

Phosphocreatine, also known as creatine phosphate (CP) or PCr (Pcr), is a phosphorylated form of creatine that serves as a rapidly mobilizable reserve of high-energy phosphates in skeletal muscle, myocardium and the brain to recycle adenosine triphosphate (ATP), the energy currency of the cell.

== Chemistry ==
In the kidneys, the enzyme AGAT catalyzes the conversion of two amino acids—arginine and glycine—into guanidinoacetate (also called glycocyamine or GAA), which is then transported in the blood to the liver. A methyl group is added to GAA from the amino acid methionine by the enzyme GAMT, forming non-phosphorylated creatine. This is then released into the blood by the liver where it travels mainly to the muscle cells (95% of the body's creatine is in muscles), and to a lesser extent the brain, heart, and pancreas. Once inside the cells it is transformed into phosphocreatine by the enzyme complex creatine kinase.

Phosphocreatine is able to donate its phosphate group to convert adenosine diphosphate (ADP) into adenosine triphosphate (ATP). This process is an important component of all vertebrates' bioenergetic systems. For instance, while the human body only produces 250 g of ATP daily, it recycles its entire body weight in ATP each day through creatine phosphate.

Phosphocreatine can be broken down into creatinine, which is then excreted in the urine. A 70 kg man contains around 120 g of creatine, with 40% being the unphosphorylated form and 60% as creatine phosphate. Of that amount, 1–2% is broken down and excreted each day as creatinine.

Phosphocreatine is used intravenously in hospitals in some parts of the world for cardiovascular problems under the name Neoton, and also used by some professional athletes, as it is not a controlled substance.

== Function ==
Phosphocreatine can anaerobically donate a phosphate group to ADP to form ATP during the first five to eight seconds of a maximal muscular effort. Conversely, excess ATP can be used during a period of low effort to convert creatine back to phosphocreatine.

The reversible phosphorylation of creatine (i.e., both the forward and backward reaction) is catalyzed by several creatine kinases. The presence of creatine kinase (CK-MB, creatine kinase myocardial band) in blood plasma is indicative of tissue damage and is used in the diagnosis of myocardial infarction.

The cell's ability to generate phosphocreatine from excess ATP during rest, as well as its use of phosphocreatine for quick regeneration of ATP during intense activity, provides a spatial and temporal buffer of ATP concentration. In other words, phosphocreatine acts as high-energy reserve in a coupled reaction; the energy given off from donating the phosphate group is used to regenerate the other compound—in this case, ATP. Phosphocreatine plays a particularly important role in tissues that have high, fluctuating energy demands such as muscle and brain.

== History ==
The discovery of phosphocreatine was reported by Grace and Philip Eggleton of the University of Cambridge and separately by Cyrus Fiske and Yellapragada Subbarow of the Harvard Medical School in 1927. A few years later David Nachmansohn, working under Meyerhof at the Kaiser Wilhelm Institute in Dahlem, Berlin, contributed to the understanding of the phosphocreatine's role in the cell.
