= Creatine kinase =

Class of enzymes

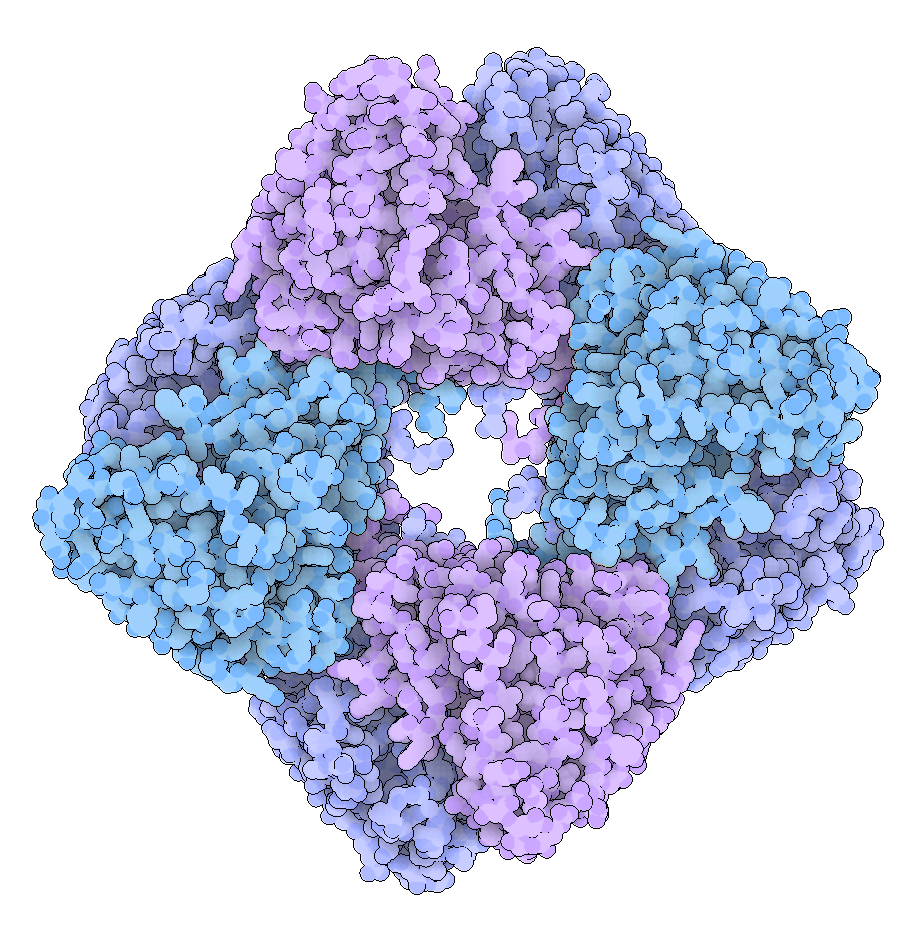
- Molecular surface model of human creatine kinase (PDB: 1QK1).

Identifiers
- EC no.: 2.7.3.2
- CAS no.: 9001-15-4

Databases
- BRENDA: enzyme data
- ExPASy: NiceZyme view
- KEGG: enzyme entry
- MetaCyc: metabolic pathway
- Rhea: reactions
- PDB structures: RCSB PDB PDBe PDBsum
- Gene Ontology: AmiGO / QuickGO
Search
- PMC: articles
- PubMed: articles
- NCBI: proteins

Creatine kinase (CK), also known as creatine phosphokinase (CPK) or phosphocreatine kinase, is an enzyme (EC 2.7.3.2) expressed by various tissues and cell types. CK catalyses the conversion of creatine and uses adenosine triphosphate (ATP) to create phosphocreatine (PCr) and adenosine diphosphate (ADP). This CK enzyme reaction is reversible and thus ATP can be generated from PCr and ADP.

In tissues and cells that consume ATP rapidly, especially skeletal muscle, but also brain, photoreceptor cells of the retina, hair cells of the inner ear, spermatozoa and smooth muscle, PCr serves as an energy reservoir for the rapid buffering and regeneration of ATP in situ, as well as for intracellular energy transport by the PCr shuttle or circuit. Thus creatine kinase is an important enzyme in such tissues.

Clinically, creatine kinase is assayed in blood tests as a marker of damage of CK-rich tissue such as in myocardial infarction (heart attack), rhabdomyolysis (severe muscle breakdown), muscular dystrophy, autoimmune myositides, and acute kidney injury.

Reaction catalysed by Creatine kinase (CK). Cr = creatine, PCr = phosphocreatine / creatine phosphate. In situations of high ATP demand, ADP can be substrate-level phosphorylated by CK with the help of PCr to form ATP.

== Types ==
In the cells, the cytosolic CK enzymes consist of two subunits, which can be either B (brain type) or M (muscle type). There are, therefore, three different isoenzymes: CK-MM, CK-BB and CK-MB. The genes for these subunits are located on different chromosomes: B on 14q32 and M on 19q13. In addition to those three cytosolic CK isoforms, there are two mitochondrial creatine kinase isoenzymes, the ubiquitous form and the sarcomeric form. The functional entity of the mitochondrial CK isoforms is an octamer consisting of four dimers each.

While mitochondrial creatine kinase is directly involved in the formation of phosphocreatine from mitochondrial ATP, cytosolic CK regenerates ATP from ADP, using PCr. This happens at intracellular sites where ATP is used in the cell, with CK acting as an in situ ATP regenerator.

gene	protein
CKB	creatine kinase, brain, BB-CK
CKBE	creatine kinase, ectopic expression
CKM	creatine kinase, muscle, MM-CK
CKMT1A, CKMT1B	creatine kinase mitochondrial 1; ubiquitous mtCK; or _{u}mtCK
CKMT2	creatine kinase mitochondrial 2; sarcomeric mtCK; or _{s}mtCK

Isoenzyme patterns differ in tissues. Skeletal muscle expresses CK-MM (98%) and low levels of CK-MB (1%). The myocardium (heart muscle), in contrast, expresses CK-MM at 70% and CK-MB at 25–30%. CK-BB is predominantly expressed in brain and smooth muscle, including vascular and uterine tissue.

== Protein structure ==
The first structure of a creatine kinase solved by X-ray protein crystallography was that of the octameric, sarcomeric muscle-type mitochondrial CK (s-mtCK) in 1996., followed by the structure of ubiquitous mitochondrial CK (u-mtCK) in 2000. The atomic structure of the banana-shaped, dimeric cytosolic brain-type BB-CK was solved in 1999 at a resolution of 1,4 Å. Cytosolic BB-CK, as well as muscle-type MM-CK both form banana-shaped symmetric dimers, with one catalytic active site in each subunit.

== Functions ==
Mitochondrial creatine kinase (CK_{m}) is present in the mitochondrial intermembrane space, where it regenerates phosphocreatine (PCr) from mitochondrially generated ATP and creatine (Cr) imported from the cytosol. Apart from the two mitochondrial CK isoenzyme forms, that is, ubiquitous mtCK (present in non-muscle tissues) and sarcomeric mtCK (present in sarcomeric muscle), there are three cytosolic CK isoforms present in the cytosol, depending on the tissue. Whereas MM-CK is expressed in sarcomeric muscle, that is, skeletal and cardiac muscle, MB-CK is expressed in cardiac muscle, and BB-CK is expressed in smooth muscle and in most non-muscle tissues.

Mitochondrial mtCK and cytosolic CK are connected in a so-called PCr/Cr-shuttle or circuit. PCr generated by mtCK in mitochondria is shuttled to cytosolic CK that is coupled to ATP-dependent processes, e.g. ATPases, such as acto-myosin ATPase and calcium ATPase involved in muscle contraction, and sodium/potassium ATPase involved in sodium retention in the kidney. The bound cytosolic CK accepts the PCr shuttled through the cell and uses ADP to regenerate ATP, which can then be used as an energy source by the ATPases (CK is associated intimately with the ATPases, forming a functionally coupled microcompartment). PCr is not only an energy buffer, but also a cellular transport form of energy between subcellular sites of energy (ATP) production (mitochondria and glycolysis) and those of energy utilization (ATPases).

Thus, CK enhances skeletal, cardiac, and smooth muscle contractility, and is involved in the generation of blood pressure. Further, the ADP-scavenging action of creatine kinase has been implicated in bleeding disorders: persons with highly elevated plasma CK could be prone to major bleeding.

== Laboratory testing ==
Serum Creatine kinase
- Reference range: 60 and 400 IU/L
- Purpose: Detection of muscle damage.
- Test of: The amount of creatine kinase in the blood.

CK is often determined routinely in a medical laboratory. It used to be determined specifically in patients with chest pain to recognize acute myocardial infarction, but this test has been largely replaced by troponin. Normal values at rest are usually between 60 and 400 IU/L, where one unit is enzyme activity, more specifically the amount of enzyme that will catalyze 1 μmol of substrate per minute under specified conditions (temperature, pH, substrate concentrations and activators.) This test is not specific for the type of CK that is elevated.

Creatine kinase in the blood may be high in health and disease. Exercise increases the outflow of creatine kinase to the blood stream for up to a week, and this is the most common cause of high CK in blood. Furthermore, high CK in the blood may be related to high intracellular CK such as in persons of African descent.

Finally, high CK in the blood may be an indication of damage to CK-rich tissue, such as in rhabdomyolysis, myocardial infarction, myositis and myocarditis. This means creatine kinase in blood may be elevated in a wide range of clinical conditions including the use of medication such as statins; endocrine disorders such as hypothyroidism; and skeletal muscle diseases and disorders including malignant hyperthermia, and neuroleptic malignant syndrome.

Furthermore, the isoenzyme determination has in the past been used extensively as an indication for myocardial damage in heart attacks. Troponin measurement has largely replaced this in many hospitals, although some centers still rely on CK-MB.

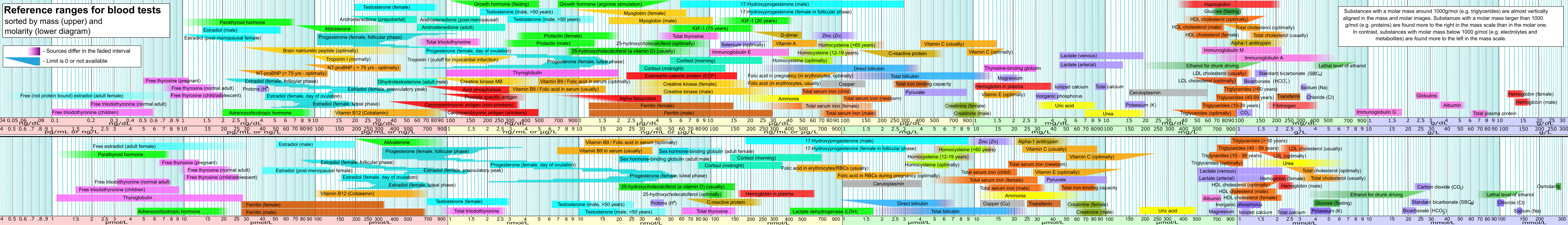
Reference ranges for blood tests, comparing blood content of creatine kinase (shown in orange, to left of ammonia [yellow]) with other constituents.

== Nomenclature ==
This enzyme is often listed in medical literature under an incorrect name: "creatinine kinase". Creatinine is not a substrate or a product of the enzyme.

== See also ==
- Reference ranges for blood tests
- CPK-MB test
