= TNNI1 =

Protein-coding gene in humans

Identifiers
- Aliases: TNNI1, SSTNI, TNN1, troponin I1, slow skeletal type
- External IDs: OMIM: 191042; MGI: 105073; GeneCards: TNNI1

Gene location (Human)
Chr.	Chromosome 1 (human)
Band	1q32.1	Start	201,403,768 bp
Band	1q32.1	End	201,429,866 bp

Gene location (Mouse)
Chr.	Chromosome 1 (mouse)
Band	1 E4|1 59.28 cM	Start	135,707,172 bp
Band	1 E4|1 59.28 cM	End	135,738,727 bp
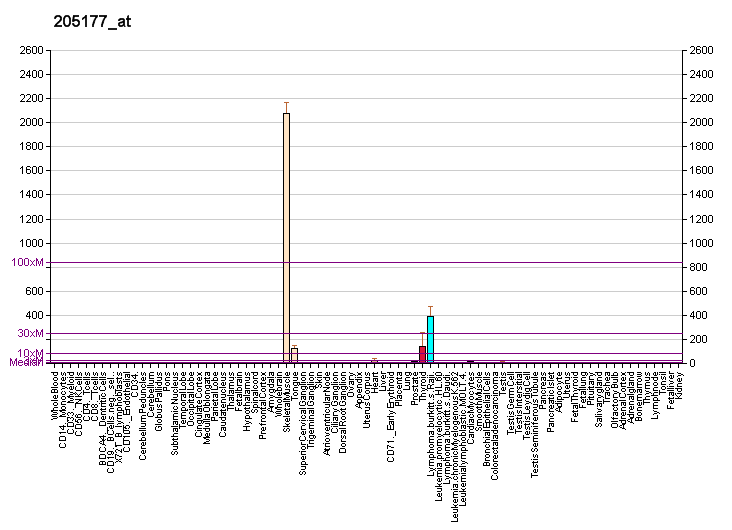
RNA expression pattern
Bgee	Human / Mouse (ortholog); Top expressed in: Skeletal muscle tissue of rectus abdominis; Skeletal muscle tissue of biceps brachii; triceps brachii muscle; muscle of thigh; thoracic diaphragm; glutes; vastus lateralis muscle; gastrocnemius muscle; body of tongue; deltoid muscle / Top expressed in: soleus muscle; atrium; endocardial cushion; atrioventricular valve; ankle; plantaris muscle; extraocular muscle; thoracic diaphragm; intercostal muscle; human fetus; More reference expression data
BioGPS	More reference expression data
Gene ontology
Molecular function	actin binding; protein binding; metal ion binding
Cellular component	cytosol; troponin complex
Biological process	ventricular cardiac muscle tissue morphogenesis; skeletal muscle contraction; regulation of striated muscle contraction; cardiac muscle contraction; transition between fast and slow fiber; muscle filament sliding; muscle contraction
Sources:Amigo / QuickGO
Orthologs
Databases	NCBI: entry; OMA: entry
Species	Human	Mouse
Entrez	7135	21952
Ensembl	ENSG00000159173	ENSMUSG00000026418
UniProt	P19237	Q9WUZ5
RefSeq (mRNA)	NM_003281	NM_001112702; NM_021467
RefSeq (protein)	NP_003272	NP_001106173; NP_067442
Location (UCSC)	Chr 1: 201.4 – 201.43 Mb	Chr 1: 135.71 – 135.74 Mb
PubMed search
- Wikidata
View/Edit Human	View/Edit Mouse

Troponin I, slow skeletal muscle is a protein that in humans is encoded by the TNNI1 gene. It is a tissue-specific subtype of troponin I, which in turn is a part of the troponin complex.

Gene TNNI1, troponin I type 1 (skeletal muscle, slow), also known as TNN1 and SSTNI, is located at 1q31.3 in the human chromosomal genome, encoding the slow twitch skeletal muscle isoform of troponin I (ssTnI), the inhibitory subunit of the troponin complex in striated muscle myofilaments. Human TNNI1 spans 12.5 kilobases in the genomic DNA and contains 9 exons and 8 introns. Exon 2 to exon 8 contain the coding sequences, encoding a protein of 21.7 kDa consisting of 187 amino acids including the first methionine with an isoelectric point (pI) of 9.59.

== Gene evolution ==
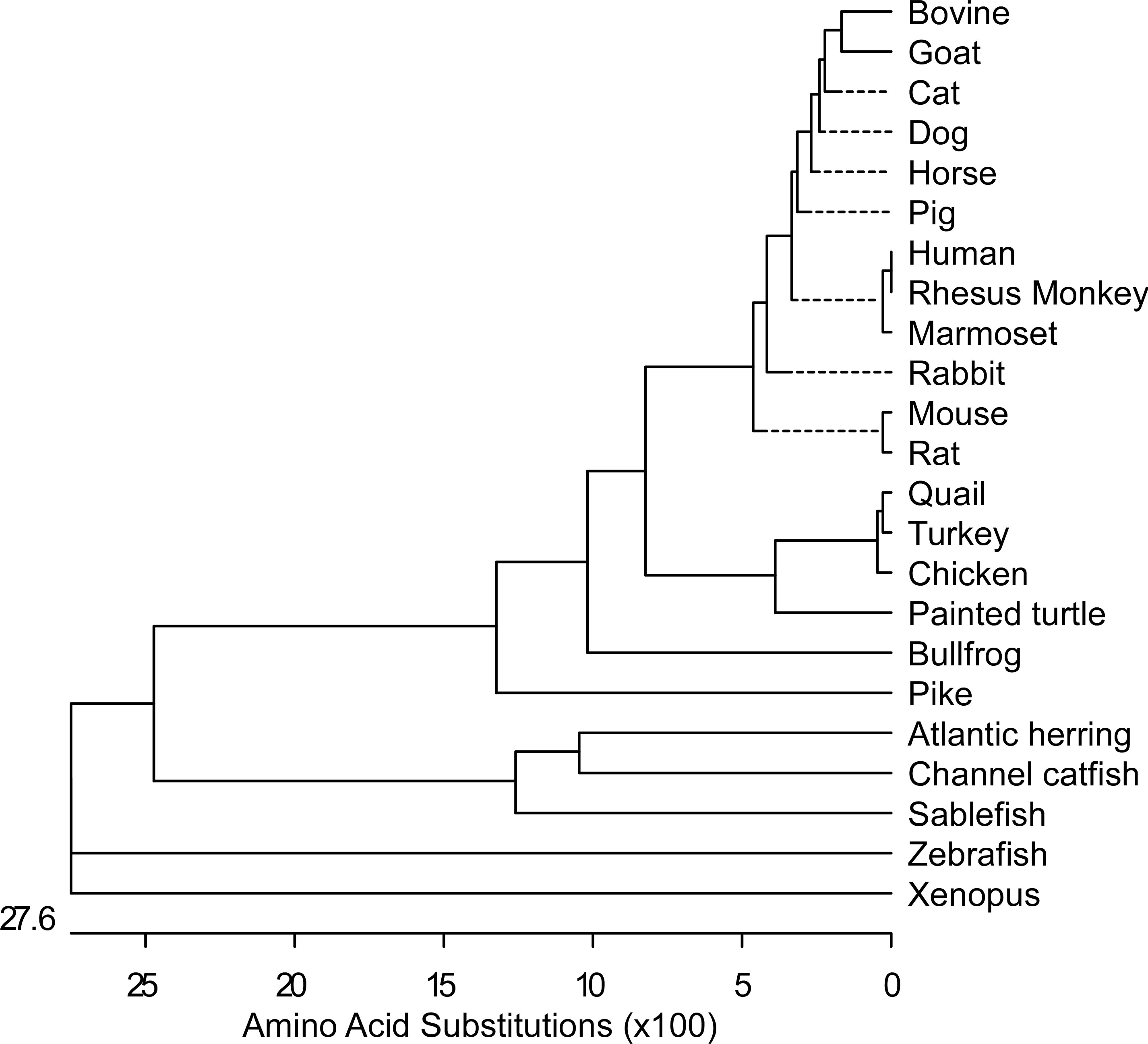
Figure 1: Evolutionary lineage of vertebrate TNNI1 deduced from alignment of ssTnI amino acid sequences

Three homologous genes have evolved in vertebrates, encoding three muscle type-specific isoforms of TnI. In mammals, the amino acid sequence of ssTnI is highly conserved. Mouse and bovine ssTnI each differs from human ssTnI in only four amino acids, and rhesus monkey ssTnI is identical to human in the amino acid sequences. In lower vertebrates, the divergence of ssTnI between species is larger than that in the higher vertebrates (Fig1).

== Tissue distribution ==
Comparing with the fast twitch skeletal muscle and cardiac TnI isoform genes (TNNT2 and TNNT3), TNNI1 has a broader range of expression in avian and mammalian striated muscles. It is the predominant TnI isoform expressed in both slow skeletal muscle and cardiac muscle in early embryonic stage. An isoform switch from ssTnI to cTnI occurs during perinatal heart development. ssTnI is not expressed in the embryonic hearts of Xenopus and zebrafish, while it is expressed in the somites and skeletal muscles.

== Structure-function relationships ==
The function of TnI is to control striated muscle contraction and relaxation. Troponin I interacts with all major regulatory proteins in the sarcomeric thin filaments of cardiac and skeletal muscles: troponin C, troponin T, tropomyosin and actin. When cytosolic Ca^{2+} is low, TnI binds the thin filament to block the myosin binding sites on actin. The rise of cytosolic Ca^{2+} results in binding to the N-terminal domain of troponin C and induces conformational changes in troponin C and the troponin complex, which releases the inhibition of myosin-actin interaction and activates myosin ATPase and cross bridge cycling to generate myosin power strokes and muscle contraction.

To date, no high resolution structure of ssTnI has been solved. As homologous proteins, ssTnI, fast skeletal muscle TnI and cardiac TnI have highly conserved structures and crystallographic high resolution structure of partial cardiac and fast skeletal troponin complex are both available. Therefore, the structure-function relationship of ssTnI would rely on the information from studies performed on fast skeletal muscle and cardiac TnI.

== Posttranslational modifications ==
To date, no posttranslational modification of ssTnI has been identified.

== Mutations ==
To date, no human disease has been reported with mutations in TNNI1.

== Clinical significance ==
Slow to fast skeletal TnI isoform switch occurs as an indicator for slow to fast fiber type transition in muscle adaptations. Slow skeletal TnI has been proposed as a sensitive and muscle fiber type-specific marker for skeletal muscle injuries. In patients with skeletal muscle disorders, intact ssTnI or its degraded products may be detected in peripheral blood as a diagnostic indicator for slow fiber damages.
