= Proximal humerus fracture =

Break of the upper part of the bone of the arm

- Other names: Proximal humeral fracture
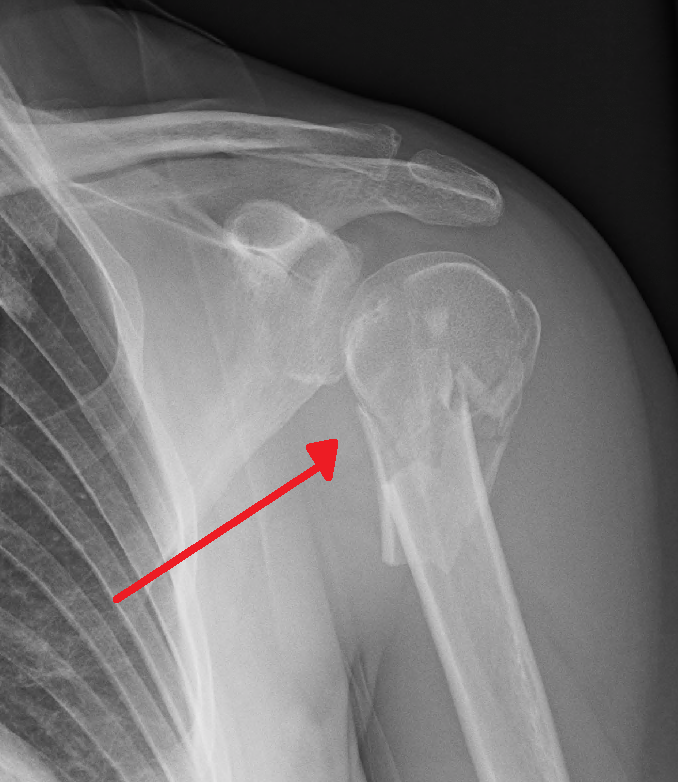
- Multi-fragmented fracture of the proximal humerus with involvement of the greater tuberosity
- Specialty: Orthopedics
- Symptoms: Pain, swelling, decreased ability to move the shoulder
- Types: 1 part, 2 part, 3 part, 4 part
- Causes: Fall onto the arm, direct trauma to the arm
- Risk factors: Osteoporosis
- Diagnostic method: X-rays, CT scan
- Treatment: Arm sling, specific exercises, surgery
- Frequency: Common

A proximal humerus fracture is a break of the upper part of the bone of the arm (humerus). Symptoms include pain, swelling, and a decreased ability to move the shoulder. Complications may include axillary nerve or axillary artery injury.

The cause is generally a fall onto the arm or direct trauma to the arm. Risk factors include osteoporosis and diabetes. Diagnosis is generally based on X-rays or CT scan. It is a type of humerus fracture. A number of classification systems exist.

Treatment is generally with an arm sling for a brief period of time followed by specific exercises. This appears appropriate in many cases even when the fragments are separated. Less commonly surgery is recommended.

Proximal humerus fractures are common. Older people are most commonly affected. In this age group they are the third most common fractures after hip and Colles fractures. Women are more often affected than men.

== Signs and symptoms ==
Typical signs and symptoms include pain, swelling, bruising, and limited range of motion at the shoulder. Deformity may be present in severe fractures, however, musculature may cause absence of deformity on inspection.

Numbness over the outside part of the upper arm and deltoid muscle weakness may indicate axillary nerve injury. Symptoms from poor blood circulation in the arm is uncommon due to collateral circulation in the arm.

== Cause ==
Young adults without risk factors usually require significant trauma, such as in the setting of a motor vehicle collision.

Older adults more commonly experience proximal humerus fractures after a fall from standing height.

=== Risk factors ===
People with increased risk of falls are more likely to have a proximal humerus fracture, as this is also the most common mechanism of injury.

Osteoporosis increases the risk of proximal humerus fractures.

== Pathophysiology ==
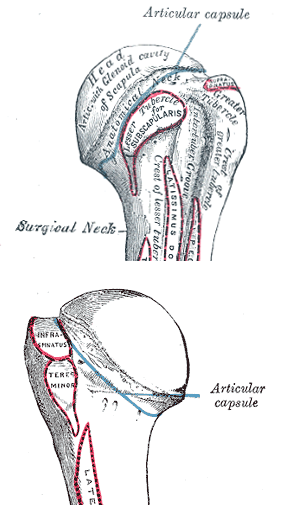
Anterior and posterior views of the proximal humerus with labeled bony landmarks and muscle insertion sites.

The shoulder joint consists of the glenoid cavity of the scapula and the head of the humerus. It as an extremely mobile joint that is stabilized by surrounding soft tissues such as the joint capsule, muscles, and ligaments. The greater and lesser tuberosities are bony landmarks of the proximal humerus and serve as attachment sites for musculature.

The anterior and posterior humeral circumflex arteries branch off of the axillary artery to provide the majority of the blood supply to the proximal humerus.

The axillary nerve courses inferior to the shoulder joint and innervates the deltoid and teres minor muscles. It also provides sensation at the skin overlying the shoulder. This nerve is the most commonly injured nerve in proximal humerus fractures due to its location close to the proximal humerus.

Muscles that attach to the proximal humerus and can cause a deforming force on fracture fragments include the pectoralis major, the deltoid, and the rotator cuff muscles.

== Diagnosis ==
The standard x-ray views of the shoulder include a true anterior-posterior view, a lateral (Y or outlet) view, and an axillary view. A Velpeau view can be done as an alternative to the axillary view if an examinee is unable to position the shoulder for an appropriate image. This can be obtained by having the examinee lean backward 45 degrees while an xray beam is aiming towards the floor.

A CT scan of the injured shoulder can be done to help further characterize the fracture and determine articular involvement. CT scan is also an option if an axillary view is unattainable.

MRI is not typically indicated in the setting of proximal humerus fracture, although it may be useful in assessing injury to soft tissue structures such as the rotator cuff muscles.

=== Classification ===
The Neer classification of proximal humerus fractures is the most commonly used classification system. It classifies fractures depending on the number of segments (2-4 parts), and whether or not there is displacement present. This classification has a low amount of agreement between physicians using the classification system, although formal training sessions may improve agreement.

The AO/OTA classification system is another commonly used system that groups fractures depending on whether the fracture is unifocal or bifocal, and whether or not the fracture goes through the articular surface.

== Treatment ==
There are both non-surgical and surgical options for treatment of proximal humerus fractures. The recommended treatment is decided based on fracture stability as determined with imaging and clinical exam.

=== Non-Surgical ===
Most proximal humerus fractures are stable and can be treated without surgery. Typical non-operative treatment consists of shoulder immobilization with a sling. Close follow-up and weekly x-rays are recommended in order to ensure that the fracture is healing and maintaining good alignment.

Passive range of motion exercises for the shoulder can be done when pain has subsided. This can be done with the assistance of a physical therapist.

When properly indicated, non-surgical treatment options for proximal humerus fractures have good outcomes in terms of fracture healing and restoration of arm function.

=== Surgical ===
Surgical options for unstable proximal humerus fractures include:

- Closed reduction with percutaneous pinning (CRPP)
- Open reduction with internal fixation (ORIF)
- Intramedullary rod fixation
- Shoulder arthroplasty
- Reverse shoulder arthroplasty

== Epidemiology ==
Proximal humerus fractures account for approximately 4-7% of all fractures in adults. It is the most common fracture of the humerus, as well as the most common fracture at the shoulder girdle.

They are more common in women than men, and occur more often in older adults. The average age of people who sustain a proximal humerus fracture is 63–66 years.

== Special populations ==
=== Children ===
A proximal humerus fracture in a young child may be a sign of child abuse. In older children and adolescents proximal humerus fractures frequently occur in the setting of sports or trauma.

Proximal humerus fractures in children can commonly be treated non-operatively due to the large amount of bone growth that occurs at the proximal humerus. In older children where there is less time for bone remodeling, surgery may be indicated more frequently.
