= Belgrave Hospital for Children =

- King's College Hospital Group
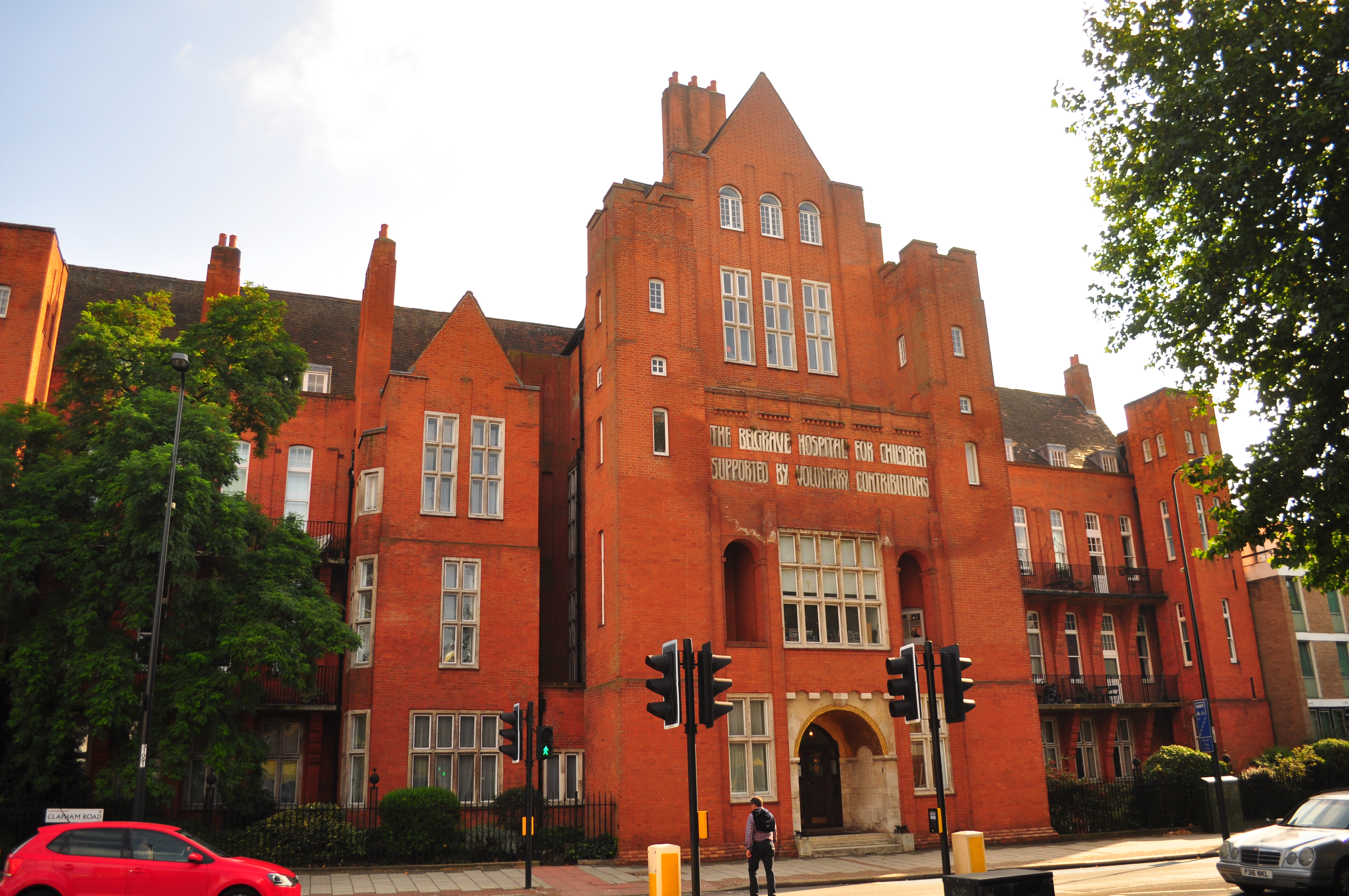
- Belgrave Hospital for Children

- Location within Lambeth

Geography
- Location: Kennington, London, United Kingdom
- Coordinates: 51°28′50.71″N 0°06′47.33″W

Organisation
- Care system: NHS England

History
- Founded: 1899; 127 years ago
- Closed: 1985; 41 years ago

The Belgrave Hospital for Children in Kennington, London, United Kingdom was a voluntary hospital founded in Pimlico, London in 1866. A new hospital building was constructed between 1899 and 1926 at 1 Clapham Road from a design by Charles Holden. It was designated a Grade II* listed building in 1981 and is currently residential flats.

== History ==
The hospital was founded in 1866 and was originally sited in Gloucester Street, Pimlico. The Kennington building was designed by Charles Holden, on a site plan by H. Percy Adams, and was built in stages between 1899 and 1926. The foundation stone was laid by Princess Beatrice on 27 June 1900.

Panels of picture tiles of nursery rhymes, made by W.B. Simpson and Sons, which decorated hospital walls were according to John Greene possibly re-sited to another King's College hospital when the hospital closed.

It joined the National Health Service in 1948 as part of the King's College Hospital Group. It closed in 1985 and remained disused until it was converted into residential accommodation in the 1990s.

== Notable staff ==
- Arthur Bankart, orthopaedic surgeon best known for describing the Bankart lesion and Bankart repair for shoulder dislocation.
- Frances Ethel Barwell RRC, (1868–1963), Matron 1899– until at least 1928. Barwell trained at The London Hospital under Eva Luckes between 1894 and 1896. She was given leave of absence to serve in France, March 1915 – April 1919 as a Sister in the Queen Alexandra's Imperial Military nursing Service Reserve.
- Sir Farquhar Buzzard, prominent British physician and Regius Professor of Medicine at the University of Oxford (1928–1943).
- Clinton Thomas Dent, surgeon, author and mountaineer.
- Robert Farquharson, Scottish doctor and Liberal politician, who served as the Member of Parliament (MP) for Aberdeenshire West.
- Alfred Morcom, medical doctor and first-class cricketer.
- Flora Murray, Scottish medical pioneer, and a member of the Women's Social and Political Union suffragettes.

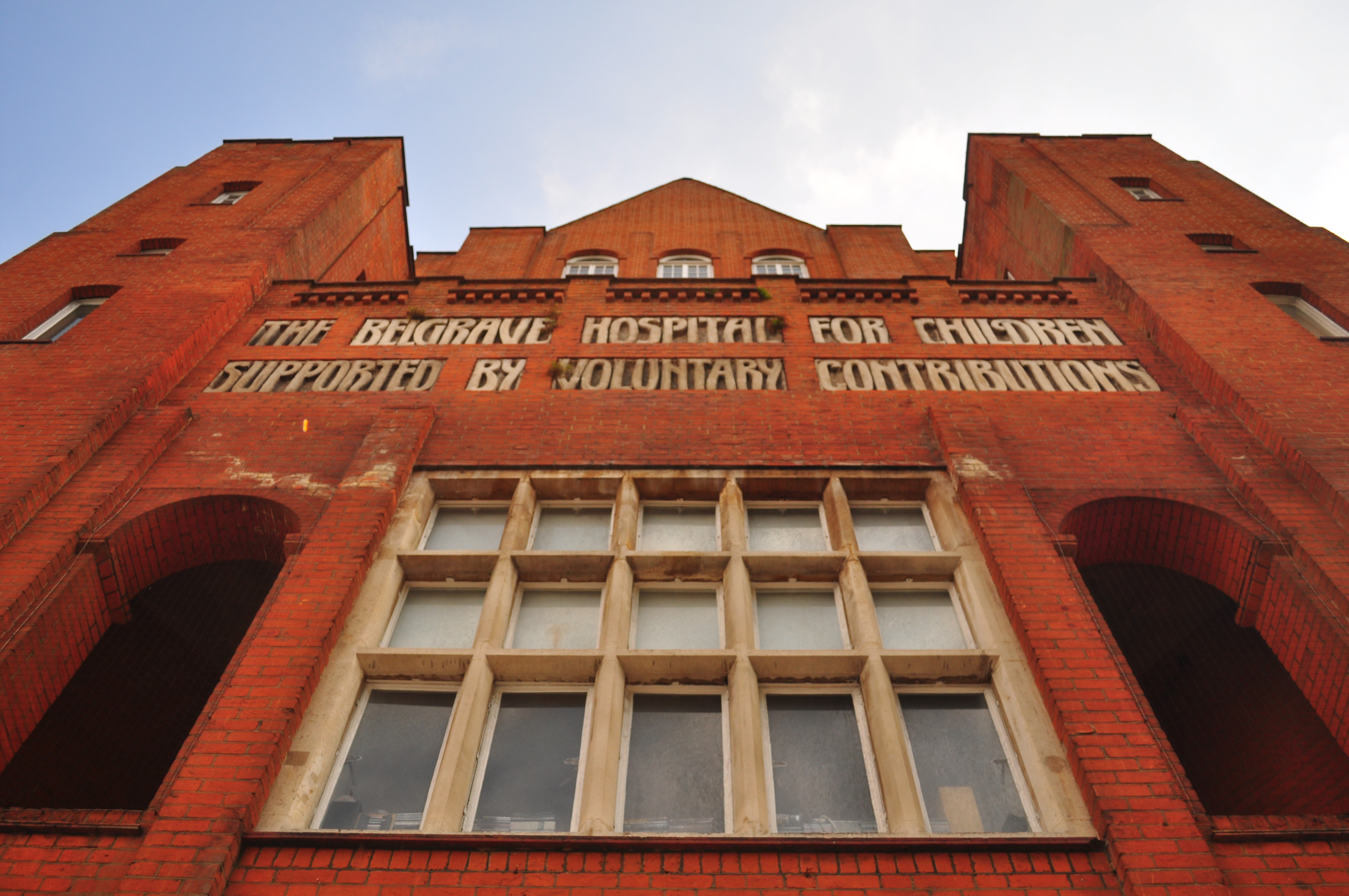
The Belgrave Hospital for Children, front detail

=== Dan Leno ===
On 20 October 1904, the music hall star Dan Leno donated £625 to the hospital after his last show. He died 11 days later.

== See also ==
- List of hospitals in England
