= Humerus fracture =

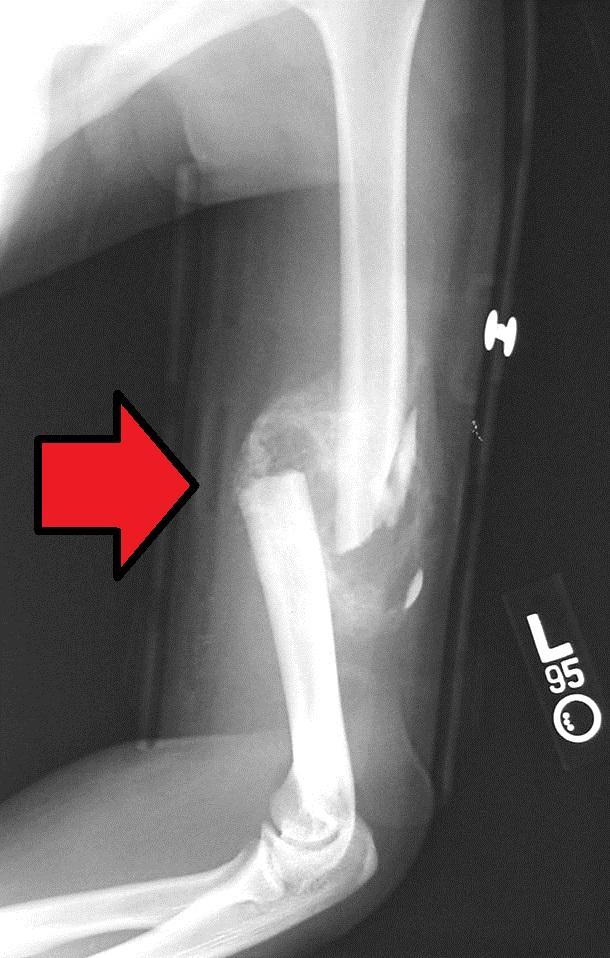
- Midshaft humerus fracture with callus formation
- Specialty: Orthopedics
- Symptoms: Pain, swelling, bruising
- Complications: Injury to an artery or nerve, compartment syndrome
- Types: Proximal humerus, humerus shaft, distal humerus
- Causes: Trauma, cancer
- Diagnostic method: X-rays
- Treatment: Sling, splint, brace, surgery
- Prognosis: Generally good (proximal and shaft), Less good (distal)
- Frequency: ~4% of fractures

A humerus fracture is a break of the humerus bone in the upper arm. Symptoms may include swelling and bruising. There may be a decreased ability to move the arm and the person may present holding their elbow. Complications may include injury to an artery or nerve, and compartment syndrome.

The cause of a humerus fracture is usually physical trauma such as a fall. Other causes include conditions such as cancer in the bone. Types include proximal humeral fractures, humeral shaft fractures, and distal humeral fractures. Diagnosis is generally confirmed by X-rays. A CT scan may be done in proximal fractures to gather further details.

Treatment options may include a sling, splint, brace, or surgery. In proximal fractures that remain well aligned, a sling is often sufficient. Many humerus shaft fractures may be treated with a brace rather than surgery. Surgical options may include open reduction and internal fixation, closed reduction and percutaneous pinning, and intramedullary nailing. Joint replacement may be another option. Proximal and shaft fractures generally have a good outcome while outcomes with distal fractures can be less good. They represent about 4% of fractures.

== Signs and symptoms ==
Types of major humerus fractures

After a humerus fracture, pain is immediate, enduring, and exacerbated with the slightest movements. The affected region swells, with bruising appearing a day or two after the fracture. The fracture is typically accompanied by a discoloration of the skin at the site of the fracture. A crackling or rattling sound may also be present, caused by the fractured humerus pressing against itself. In cases in which the nerves are affected, then there will be a loss of control or sensation in the arm below the fracture. If the fracture affects the blood supply, then the patient will have a diminished pulse at the wrist. Displaced fractures of the humerus shaft will often cause deformity and a shortening of the length of the upper arm. Distal fractures may also cause deformity, and they typically limit the ability to flex the elbow.

== Causes ==
Humerus fractures usually occur after physical trauma, falls, excess physical stress, or pathological conditions. Falls that produce humerus fractures among the elderly are usually accompanied by a preexisting risk factor for bone fracture, such as osteoporosis, a low bone density, or vitamin B deficiency.

=== Proximal ===
Proximal humerus fractures most often occur among elderly people with osteoporosis who fall on an outstretched arm. Less frequently, proximal fractures occur from motor vehicle accidents, gunshots, and violent muscle contractions from an electric shock or seizure. Other risk factors for proximal fractures include having a low bone mineral density, having impaired vision and balance, and tobacco smoking. A stress fracture of the proximal and shaft regions can occur after an excessive amount of throwing, such as pitching in baseball.

=== Middle ===
Middle fractures are usually caused by either physical trauma or falls. Physical trauma to the humerus shaft tends to produce transverse fractures whereas falls tend to produce spiral fractures. Metastatic breast cancer may also cause fractures in the humerus shaft. Long spiral fractures of the shaft that are present in children may indicate physical abuse.

=== Distal ===
Distal humerus fractures usually occur as a result of physical trauma to the elbow region. If the elbow is bent during the trauma, then the olecranon is driven upward, producing a T- or Y-shaped fracture or displacing one of the condyles.

== Diagnosis ==
Definitive diagnosis of humerus fractures is typically made through radiographic imaging. For proximal fractures, X-rays can be taken from a scapular anteroposterior (AP) view, which takes an image of the front of the shoulder region from an angle, a scapular Y view, which takes an image of the back of the shoulder region from an angle, and an axillar lateral view, which has the patient lie on his or her back, lift the bottom half of the arm up to the side, and have an image taken of the axilla region underneath the shoulder. Fractures of the humerus shaft are usually correctly identified with radiographic images taken from the AP and lateral viewpoints. Damage to the radial nerve from a shaft fracture can be identified by an inability to bend the hand backwards or by decreased sensation in the back of the hand. Images of the distal region are often of poor quality due to the patient being unable to extend the elbow because of pain. If a severe distal fracture is suspected, then a computed tomography (CT) scan can provide greater detail of the fracture. Nondisplaced distal fractures may not be directly visible; they may only be visible due to fat being displaced because of internal bleeding in the elbow.

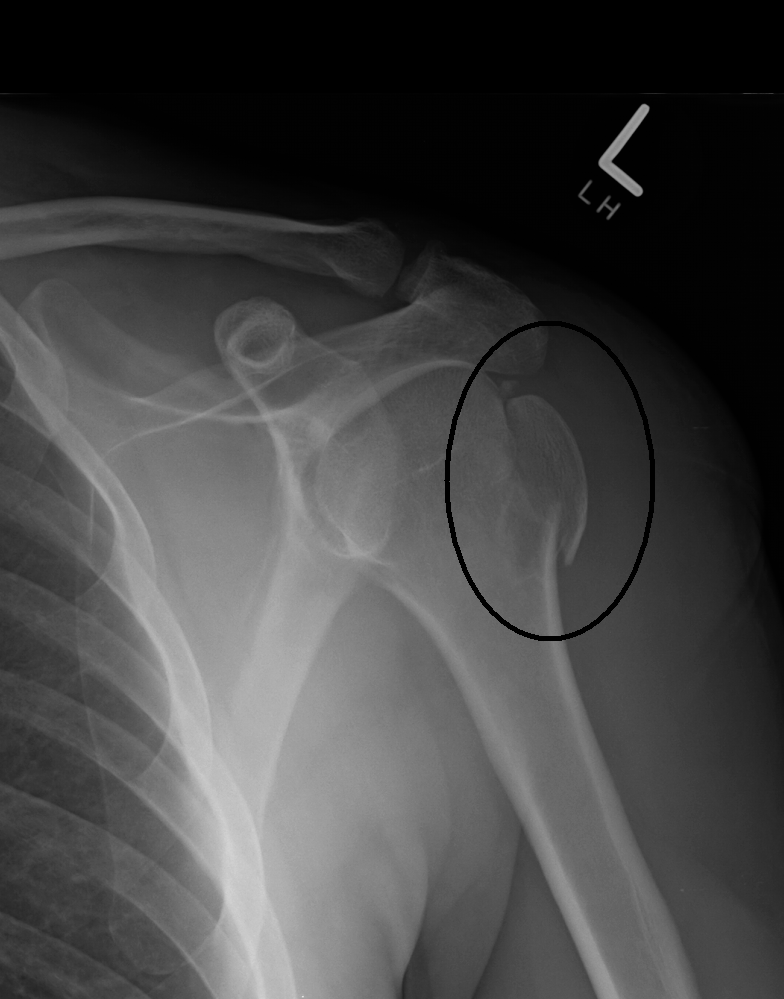
A fracture of the greater tuberosity as seen on AP X ray

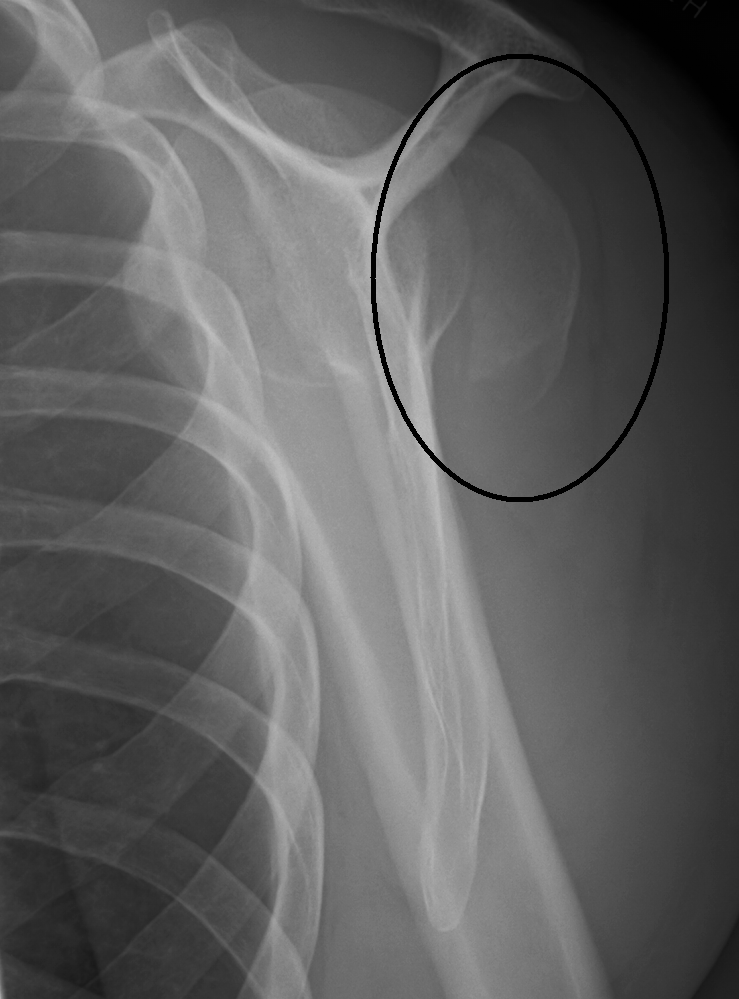
A fracture of the greater tuberosity of the humerus

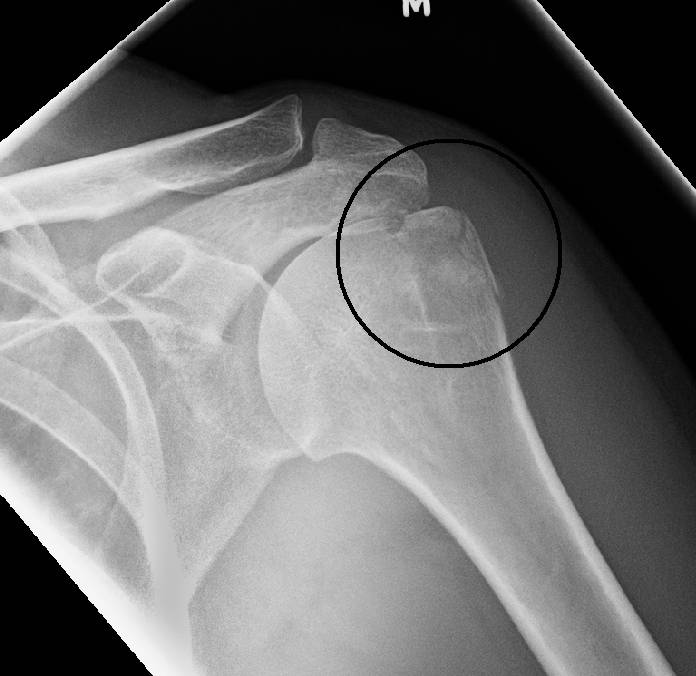
Fracture of the greater tuberosity of the humerus

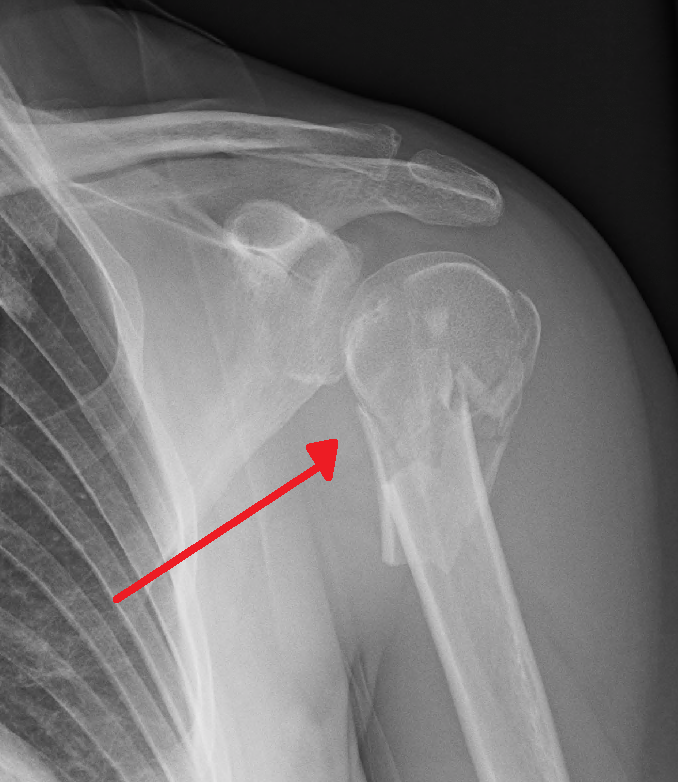
Multi-fragmented, or comminuted fracture of the proximal humerus with involvement of the greater tuberosity

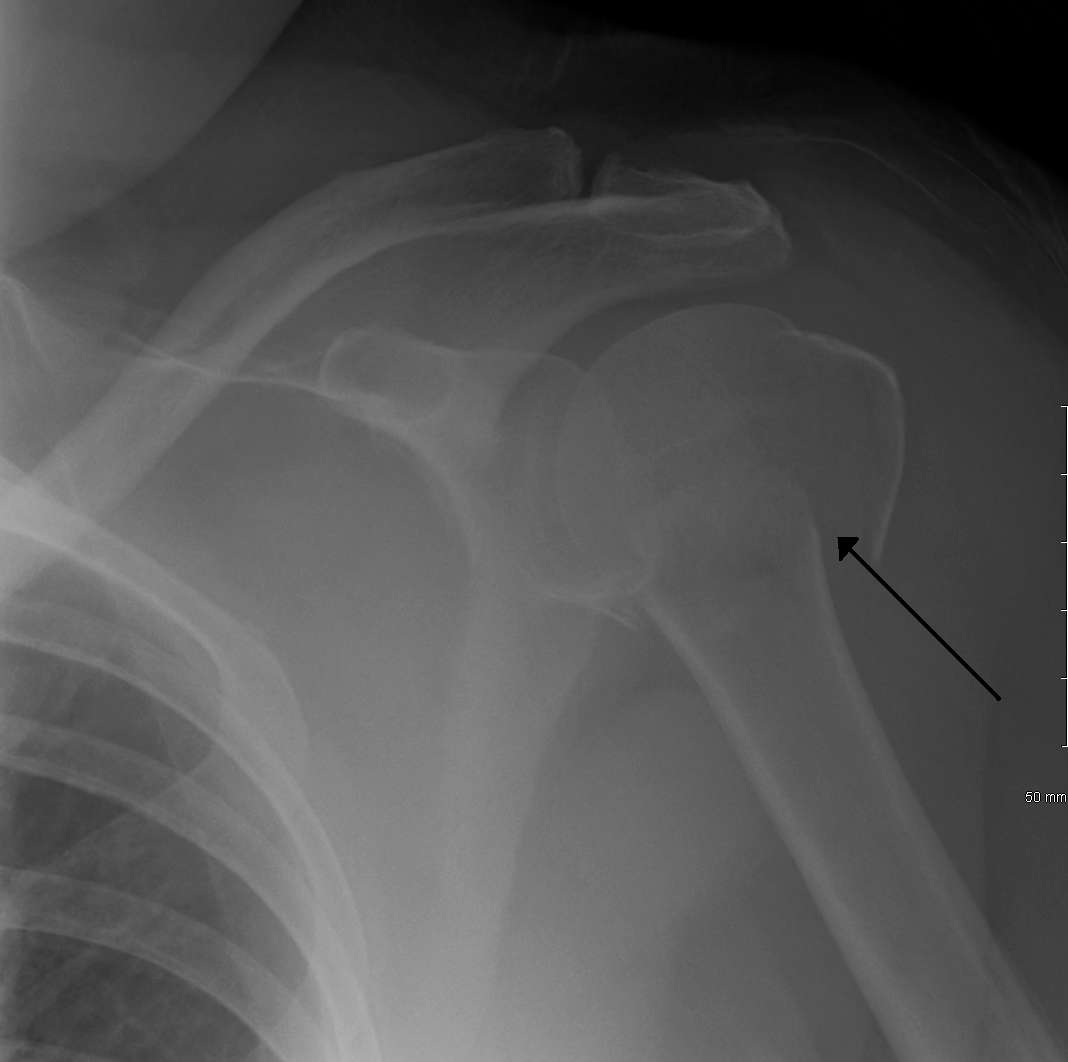
Proximal humerus fracture

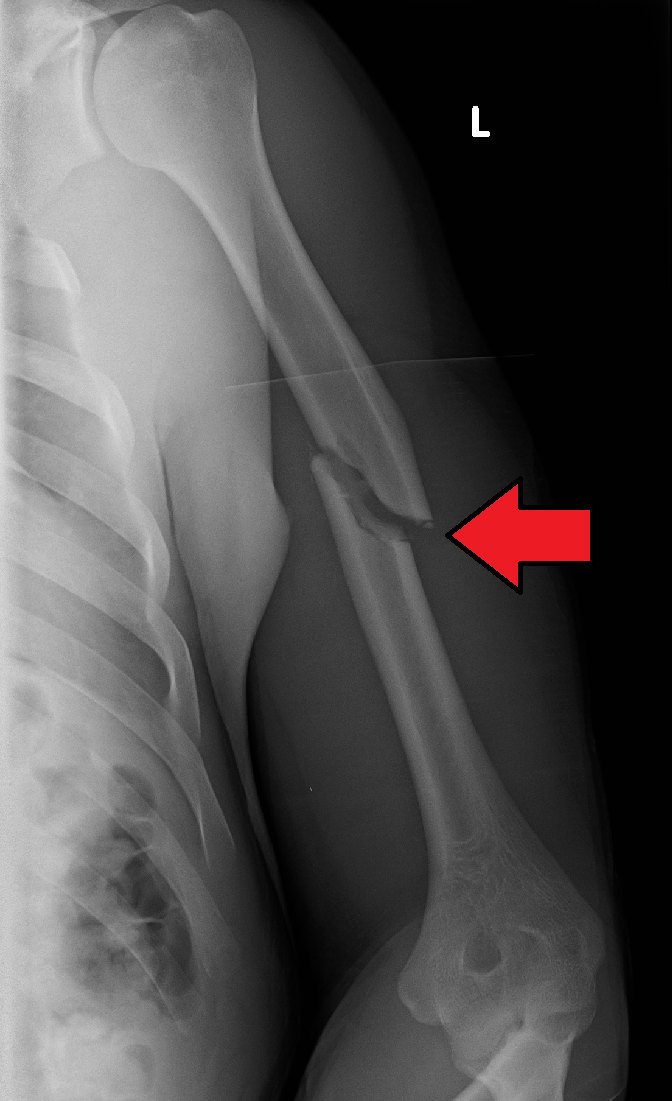
A transverse fracture of the humerus shaft

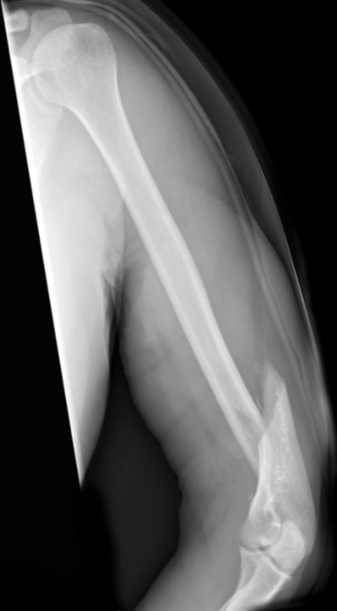
A spiral fracture of the distal one-third of the humerus shaft

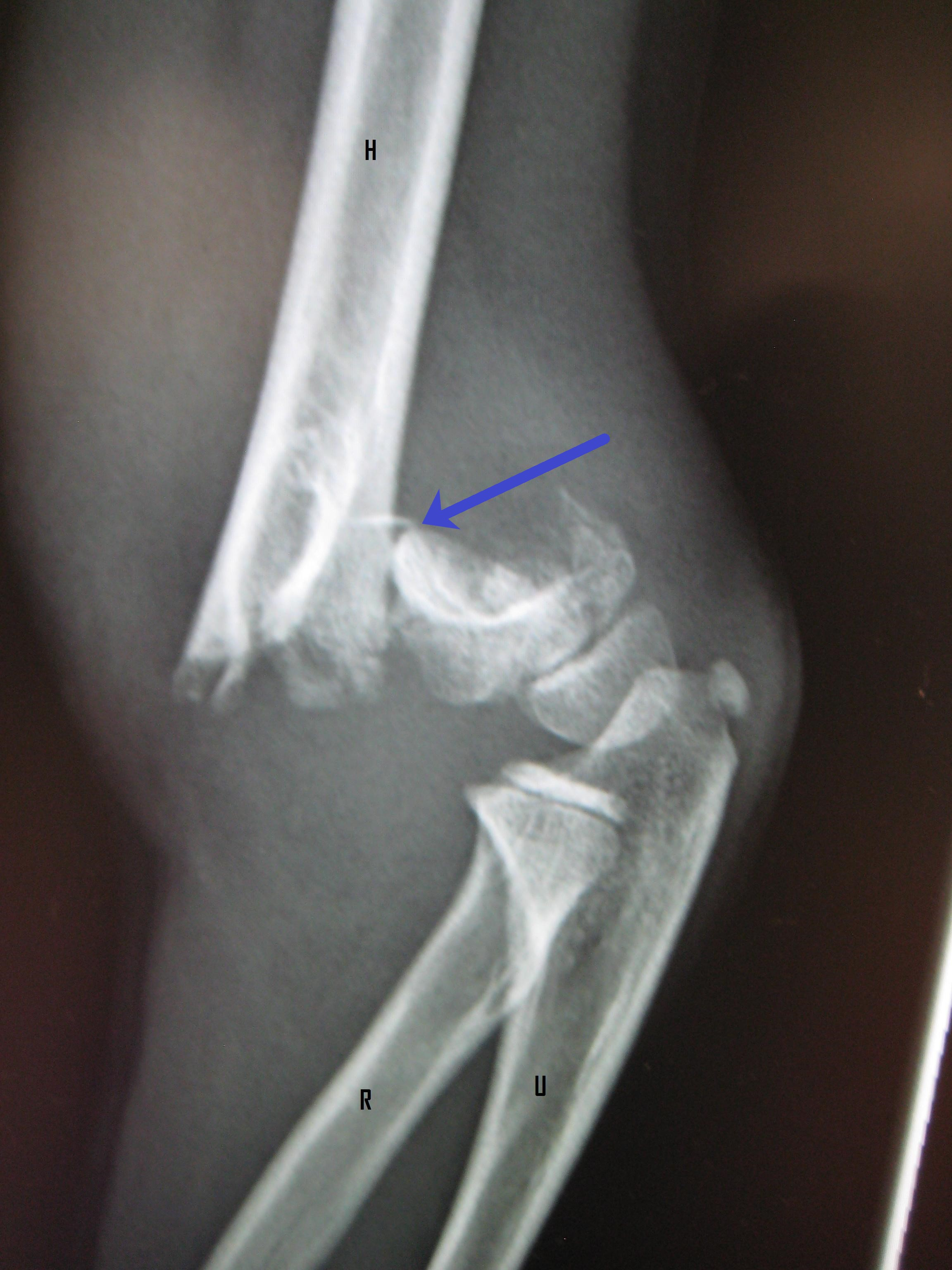
A displaced supracondylar fracture in a child

=== Classification ===
Fractures of the humerus are classified based on the location of the fracture and then by the type of fracture. There are three locations that humerus fractures occur: at the proximal location, which is the top of the humerus near the shoulder, in the middle, which is at the shaft of the humerus, and the distal location, which is the bottom of the humerus near the elbow. Proximal fractures are classified into one of four types of fractures based on the displacement of the greater tubercle, the lesser tubercle, the surgical neck, and the anatomical neck, which are the four parts of the proximal humerus, with fracture displacement being defined as at least one centimeter of separation or an angulation greater than 45 degrees. One-part fractures involve no displacement of any parts of the humerus, two-part fractures have one part displaced relative to the other three; three-part fractures have two displaced fragments, and four-part fractures have all fragments displaced from each other. Fractures of the humerus shaft are subdivided into transverse fractures, spiral fractures, "butterfly" fractures, which are a combination of transverse and spiral fractures, and pathological fractures, which are fractures caused by medical conditions. Distal fractures are split between supracondylar fractures, which are transverse fractures above the two condyles at the bottom of the humerus, and intercondylar fractures, which involve a T- or Y-shaped fracture that splits the condyles.

== Treatment ==
The aim of treatment is to minimize pain and to restore as much normal function as possible. Most humerus fractures do not require surgical intervention.

=== Proximal ===
One-part and two-part proximal fractures can be treated with a collar and cuff sling, adequate pain medicine, and follow up therapy. Two-part proximal fractures may require open or closed reduction depending on neurovascular injury, rotator cuff injury, dislocation, likelihood of union, and function. For three- and four-part proximal fractures, standard practice is to have open reduction and internal fixation to realign the separate parts of the proximal humerus. A humeral hemiarthroplasty may be required in proximal cases in which the blood supply to the region is compromised. Compared with non-surgical treatment, surgery does not result in a better outcome for the majority of people with displaced proximal humeral fractures and is likely to result in a greater need for subsequent surgery.

=== Middle ===
Fractures of the humerus shaft are most often uncomplicated, closed fractures that require nothing more than pain medicine and wearing a cast or sling. For midshaft fractures up to 12 weeks may be required for healing.

In shaft and distal cases in which complications such as damage to the neurovascular bundle exist, then surgical repair is required.

== Prognosis ==
In most cases, people are discharged from an emergency department with pain medicine and a cast or sling. These fractures are typically minor and heal over the course of a few weeks. Fractures of the proximal region, especially among elderly people, may limit future shoulder activity. Severe fractures are usually resolved with surgical intervention, followed by a period of healing using a cast or sling. Severe fractures often cause long-term loss of physical ability. Complications in the recovery process of severe fractures include osteonecrosis, malunion or nonunion of the fracture, stiffness, and rotator cuff dysfunction, which require additional intervention in order for the patient to fully recover.

== Epidemiology ==
Humerus fractures are among the most common of fractures. Proximal fractures make up 5% of all fractures and 25% of humerus fractures, middle fractures about 60% of humerus fractures (12% of all fractures), and distal fractures the remainder. Among proximal fractures, 80% are one-part, 10% are two-part, and the remaining 10% are three- and four-part. The most common location of proximal fractures is at the surgical neck of the humerus. Incidence of proximal fractures increases with age, with about 75% of cases occurring among people over the age of 60. In this age group, about three times as many women as men experience a proximal fracture. Middle fractures are also common among the elderly, but they frequently occur among physically active young adult men who experience physical trauma to the humerus. Distal fractures are rare among adults, occurring primarily in children who experience physical trauma to the elbow region.
