= Shoulder reduction =

Process of returning a dislocated shoulder to its normal position

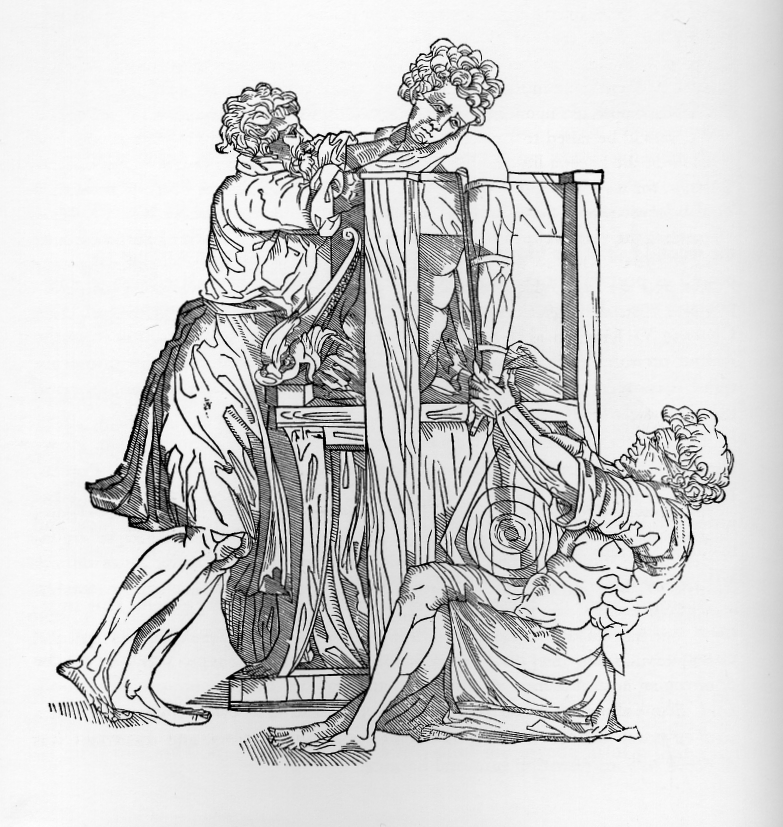
- Reduction of a dislocated shoulder with a Hippocratic device.

Shoulder reduction is the process of returning the shoulder to its normal position following a shoulder dislocation. Normally, closed reduction, in which the relationship of bone and joint is manipulated externally without surgical intervention, is used. A variety of techniques exist, but some are preferred due to fewer complications or easier execution. In cases where closed reduction is not successful, open (surgical) reduction may be needed. X-rays are often used to confirm success and absence of associated fractures. The arm should be kept in a sling or immobilizer for several days, prior to supervised recovery of motion and strength.

Various non-operative reduction techniques are employed. They have certain principles in common, including gentle in-line traction, reduction or abolition of muscle spasm, and gentle external rotation. They all strive to avoid inadvertent injury. Two of them, the Milch and Stimson techniques, have been compared in a randomized trial. Pain can be managed during the procedures either by procedural sedation and analgesia or by injecting lidocaine into the shoulder joint.

== External rotation ==
The person's arm is brought against their side. The elbow is then bent to 90 degrees and the forearm is slowly and gently externally rotated. Any discomfort or spasm interrupts the process until the person is able to relax. Reduction usually takes place by the time full external rotation has been achieved.

=== Milch ===
This is an extension of the external rotation technique. The externally rotated arm is gently abducted (brought away from the body into an overhead position) while external rotation is maintained. Gentle in-line traction is applied to the arm while some pressure is applied to the humeral head via the operator's thumb in the armpit to keep the head from moving inferiorly.

== Stimson ==
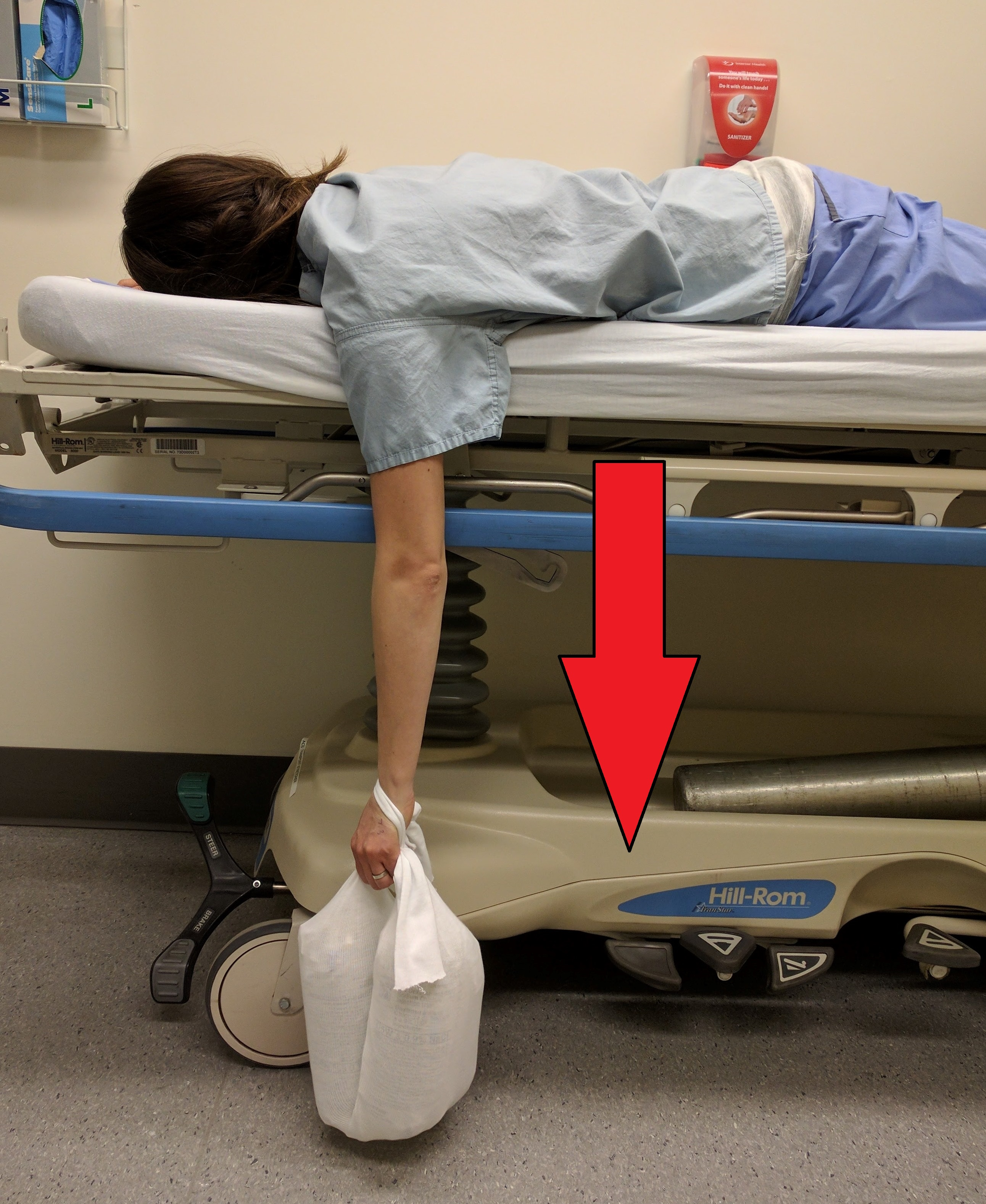
An example of Stimson maneuver. The person is lying on their stomach with a 4 kg weight tied to their wrist.

In the Stimson technique, also known as prone technique, the person lies on their stomach on a bed or bench and the arm hangs off the side, being allowed to drop toward the ground. A 5–10 kg weight is suspended from the wrist to overcome spasm and to permit reduction by the force of gravity;

== Spaso ==
The person is on their back and gentle upward traction is applied to the extremity coupled with external rotation.

== Cunningham technique ==
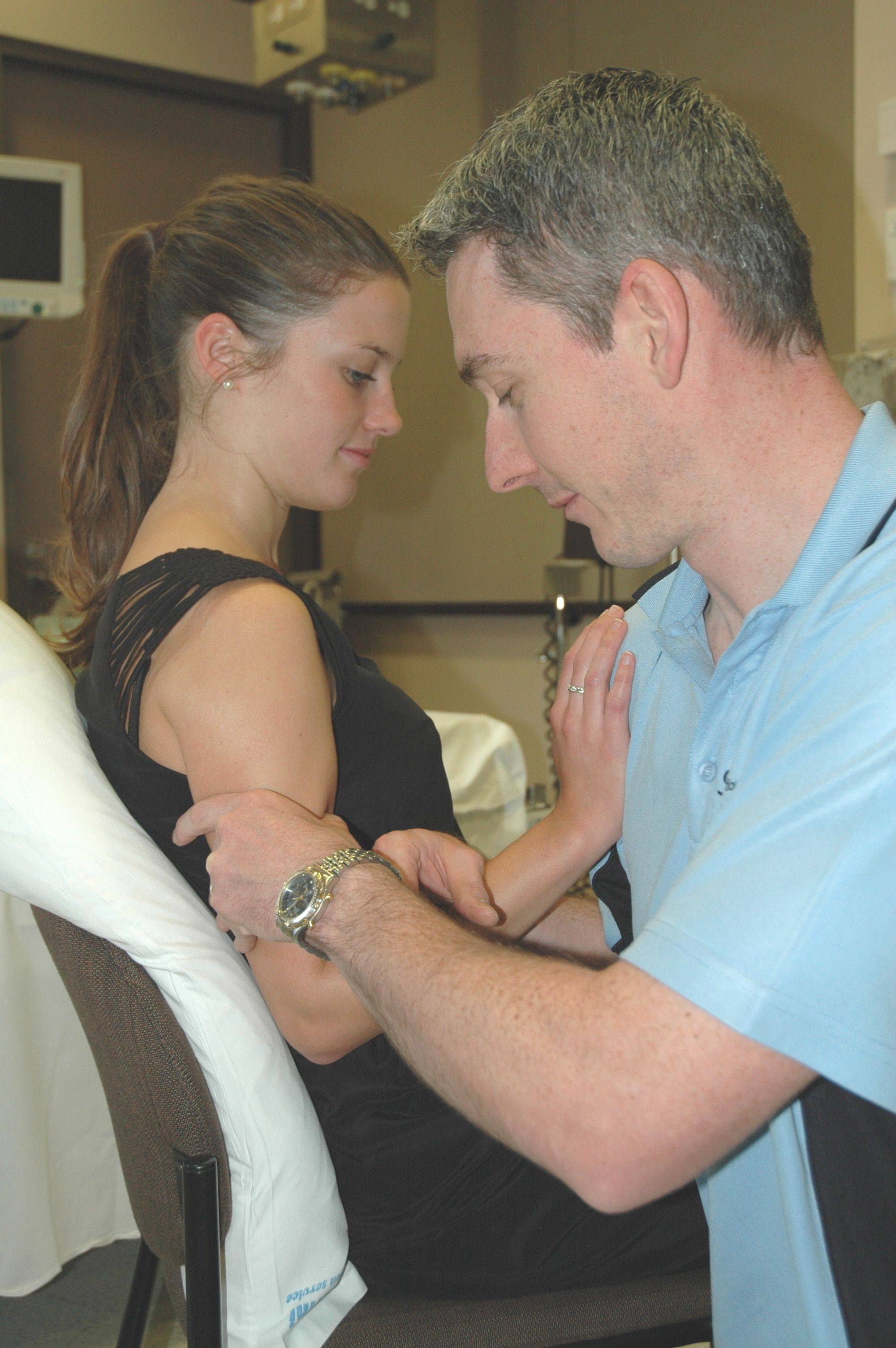
Cunningham technique

The Cunningham technique was originally published in 2003 and is an anatomically based method of shoulder reduction that utilizes positioning (analgesic position), voluntary scapular retraction, and bicipital massage. If performed correctly most patients do not require analgesia for the performance of this technique. Inappropriate use of traction will result in pain for the patient with subsequent spasm and failure to reduce. If the patient is unable to adduct the humerus or unable to cooperate with positioning the technique should not be attempted. The patient may require analgesia or sedation if they are in pain or unable to relax spasming muscles.

== FARES method ==
FARES stands for fast, reliable, and safe. With the person lying on their back, the operator holds the person's hand on the affected side while the arm is at the side and the elbow is fully extended. The forearm is in neutral position. Next, the operator gently applies longitudinal traction and slowly the arm is abducted. At the same time, continuous vertical oscillating movement at a rate of 2–3 "cycles" per second is applied throughout the whole reduction process.

== Traction countertraction ==
Traction countertraction involves pulling the dislocated arm down and outwards while an assistant pulls the body upwards.

== Kocher's method ==
Kocher's method was described in 1870 and has been incorrectly associated with neuromuscular complications and humeral fractures due to the inappropriate addition of traction by later users. It was designed for subcoracoid dislocations. "This method: Pressing the arm bent at the elbow towards the body, turning outward until resistance is felt, lifting of the outwardly rotated upper arm in the sagittal plane as far as possible, and finally slowly turning it inward."
