= Arthur Bankart =

British orthopaedic surgeon

- Born: 1879
- Died: 1951 (aged 71–72)
- Known for: Bankart lesion, Bankart repair

Arthur Sidney Blundell Bankart FRCS (1879–1951) was a British orthopaedic surgeon best known for describing the Bankart lesion and Bankart repair for shoulder dislocation.

== Biography ==
Bankart was born in Exeter, the son of surgeon James Bankart. He was educated at Rugby School, Trinity College, Cambridge, and Guy's Hospital, qualifying in medicine in 1906. He became a Fellow of the Royal College of Surgeons in 1909, and Master of Surgery in 1910.

In 1909 he became the first surgical registrar at the newly established Royal National Orthopaedic Hospital. In 1911 he was also appointed surgeon to the Maida Vale Hospital for nervous diseases, the Belgrave Hospital for Children and the Queen's Hospital for Children, all in London. Consequently, at that time he was practising orthopaedic surgery, neurosurgery and paediatric surgery at four different hospitals. He also worked with Robert Jones at the Shepherds Bush Military Orthopaedic Centre during the First World War. He performed most of the neurosurgery at the Maida Vale Hospital, particularly spinal surgery, until his departure in 1933. He was subsequently appointed orthopaedic surgeon to the Middlesex Hospital, and also performed many of the neurosurgical operations carried out there. He was one of the first surgeons in the United Kingdom to perform lateral cordotomy for pain relief.

During the Second World War he worked at Mount Vernon Hospital. He retired in 1944, but continued working until his death on 8 April 1951, after a full day of operating at Mount Vernon Hospital.

== Legacy ==
Bankart is remembered for developing a precise and fast surgical technique after studying under Arbuthnot-Lane. He would tell his students that during his time at the Royal National Orthopaedic Hospital he would discharge the old patients when the senior surgeons went on summer holiday, and would then admit new patients on whom he would operate.

Bankart described the pathology and surgical repair of recurrent shoulder dislocation in 1923, and again in 1938. Although this procedure was described by Perthes in 1906, Bankart is credited with popularizing the technique. Thus the terms Bankart lesion and Bankart Operation remain in use.

== Bibliography ==
- Manipulative Surgery, Constable and Company, 1932
