= Cunningham shoulder reduction =

Shoulder reduction technique

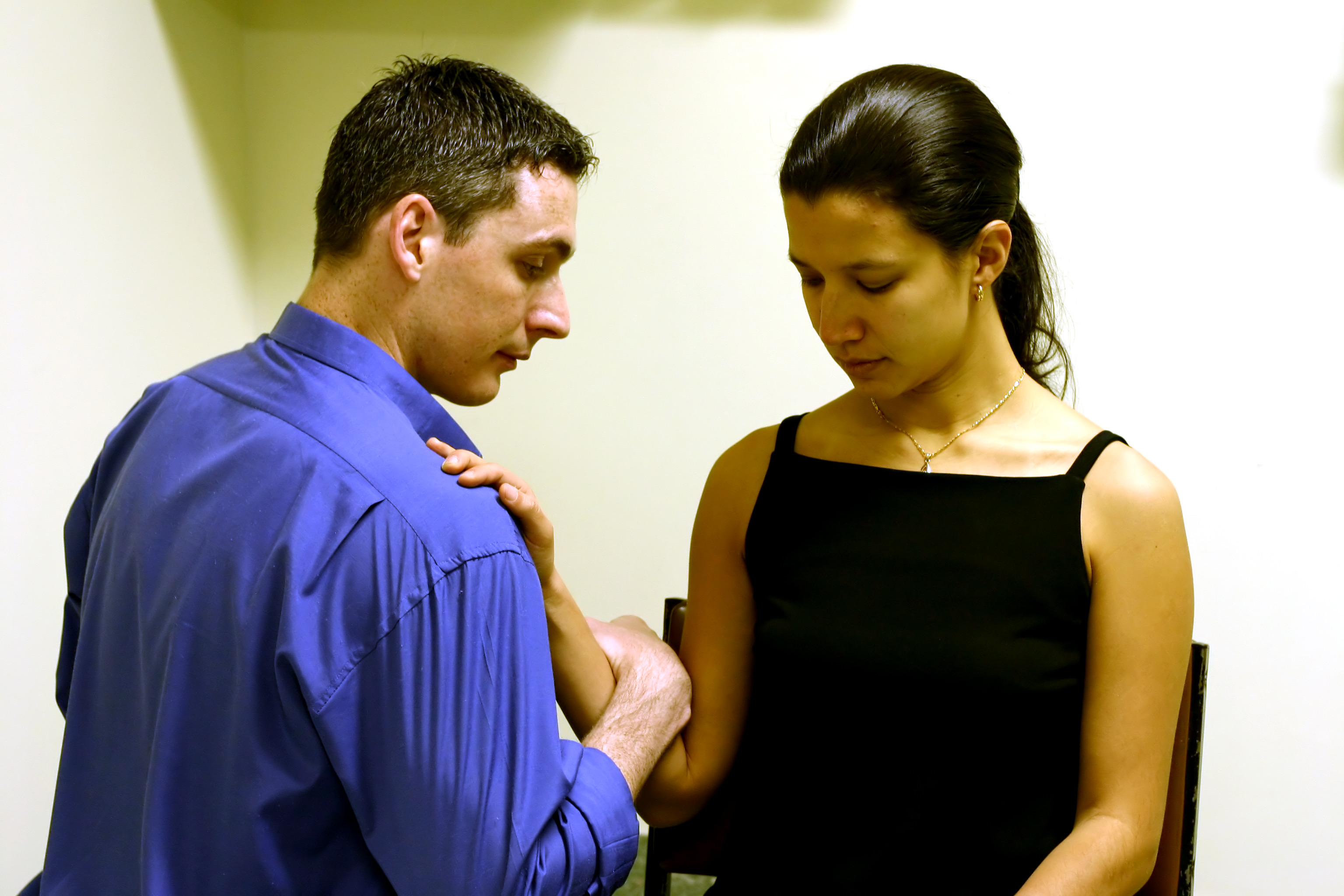

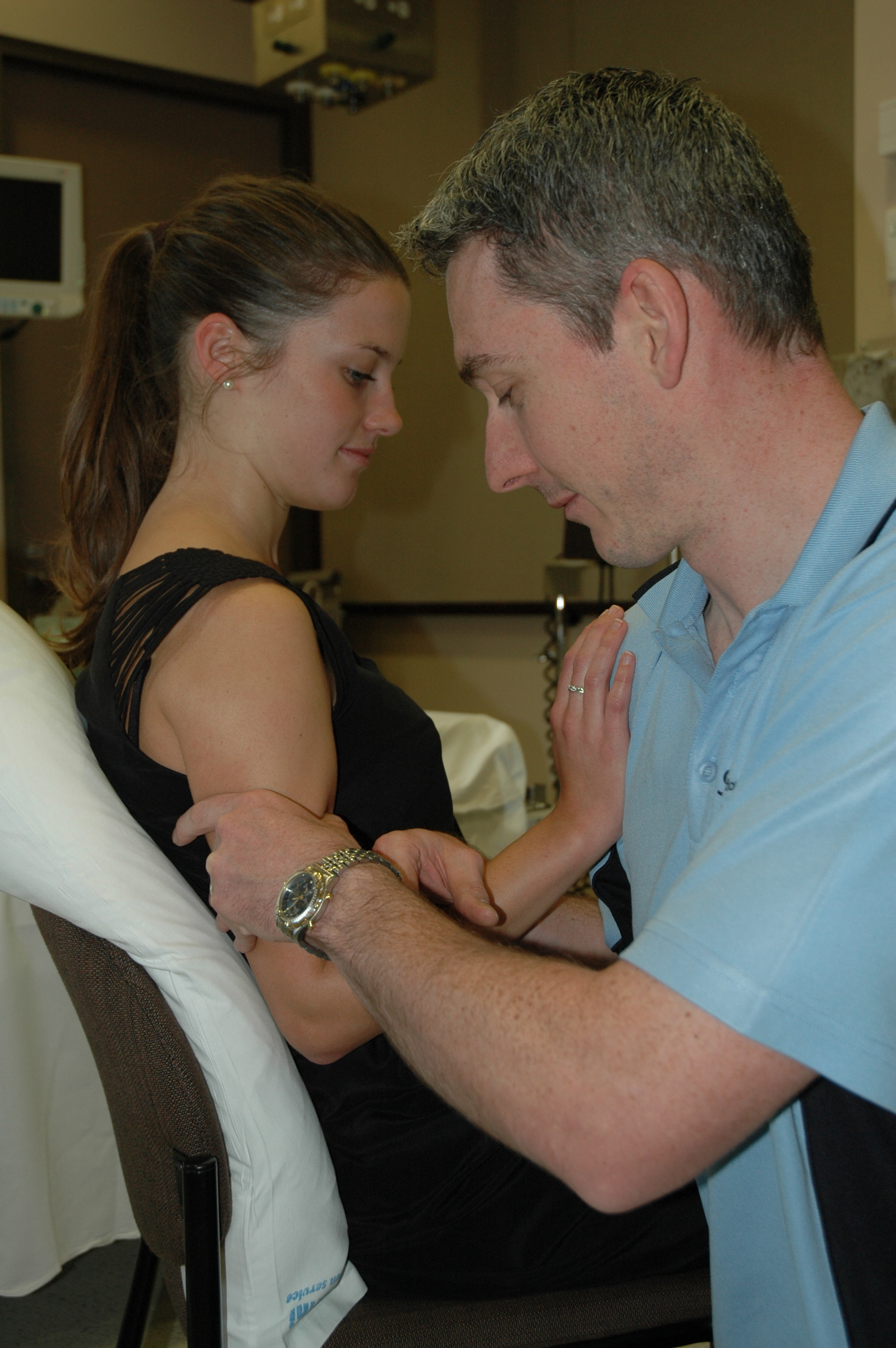
Biceps massage for Cunningham Technique

Cunningham shoulder reduction is an anatomically based method of shoulder reduction that utilizes positioning (analgesic position), voluntary scapular retraction, and bicipital massage. It is designed for true anterior/subcoracoid glenohumeral dislocations in patients who can fully adduct their humerus. This is distinct from anteroinferior / subglenoid glenohumeral dislocations for which alternative techniques should be used.

The method is one of several techniques used for shoulder reduction.

== History ==
The method was originally published in 2003.

== Mechanism ==
Shoulder dislocation is a common complication of upper limb trauma (arm pulled while in abduction or direct impact to shoulder) resulting with the humeral head sitting anteriorly out of the glenoid fossa.

Technique is as follows:

Step 1 Sit patient up (without slouching, towel or pillow down spine) and place into analgesic position. ‘Hold’- take control of the affected limb with a 'hold.' This is a firm steady downward hold (not a pull) designed to move the humeral head towards where it needs to be, taking off some of the stretch from the capsule (reducing pain), and providing confidence to the patient that you have taken control of the limb. Once you are in this position, it can be useful to ask the patient their pain level, and explain again what you are going to do. It’s important to note that the elbow is not being supported from below, but is being placed in a downwards ‘hold’. The affected arm is adducted (next to the body) and the elbow fully flexed (optimally shortens the biceps muscle, allowing full relaxation) The humerus points directly down and should be in a neutral position (no forward flexion or external rotation). Ask the patient to “shoulders back, chest out.” (reducing scapular anteversion and so reducing the static obstruction of the glenoid rim). Kneel next to your patient and place your wrist onto their forearm, with their hand resting on your shoulder.

Step 2 Massage the biceps. Ask the patient to put their “shoulders, back, chest out”, and relax. Gently massage the biceps at mid humeral level. Wait for the patient to fully relax, at which point the humeral head will slip back into place. Inform the patient that they may experience a strange sensation as the joint returns to its position and advise them not to resist this movement. Continue to gently move the humerus forward and backward to identify the optimal angle, and apply a small amount of momentum to allow the head to slide across the glenoid.

Step 3 anterior/posterior humeral movements. The humerus can then be gently moved forwards and back in order to find the perfect angle, and provide a small amount of momentum to allow the head to slide across the glenoid. This combines the principle of overcoming the movement inertia with the apposition of the slippery articular surfaces of the glenoid rim and the humeral head.

== Success ==
If performed correctly most patients do not require analgesia for the performance of this technique. Inappropriate use of traction will result in pain for the patient with subsequent spasm and failure to reduce. If the patient is unable to adduct the humerus, or unable to cooperate with positioning, the technique should not be attempted. The patient may require analgesia or sedation if they are in pain or unable to relax spasming muscles.
