= Distal humeral fracture =

Medical condition

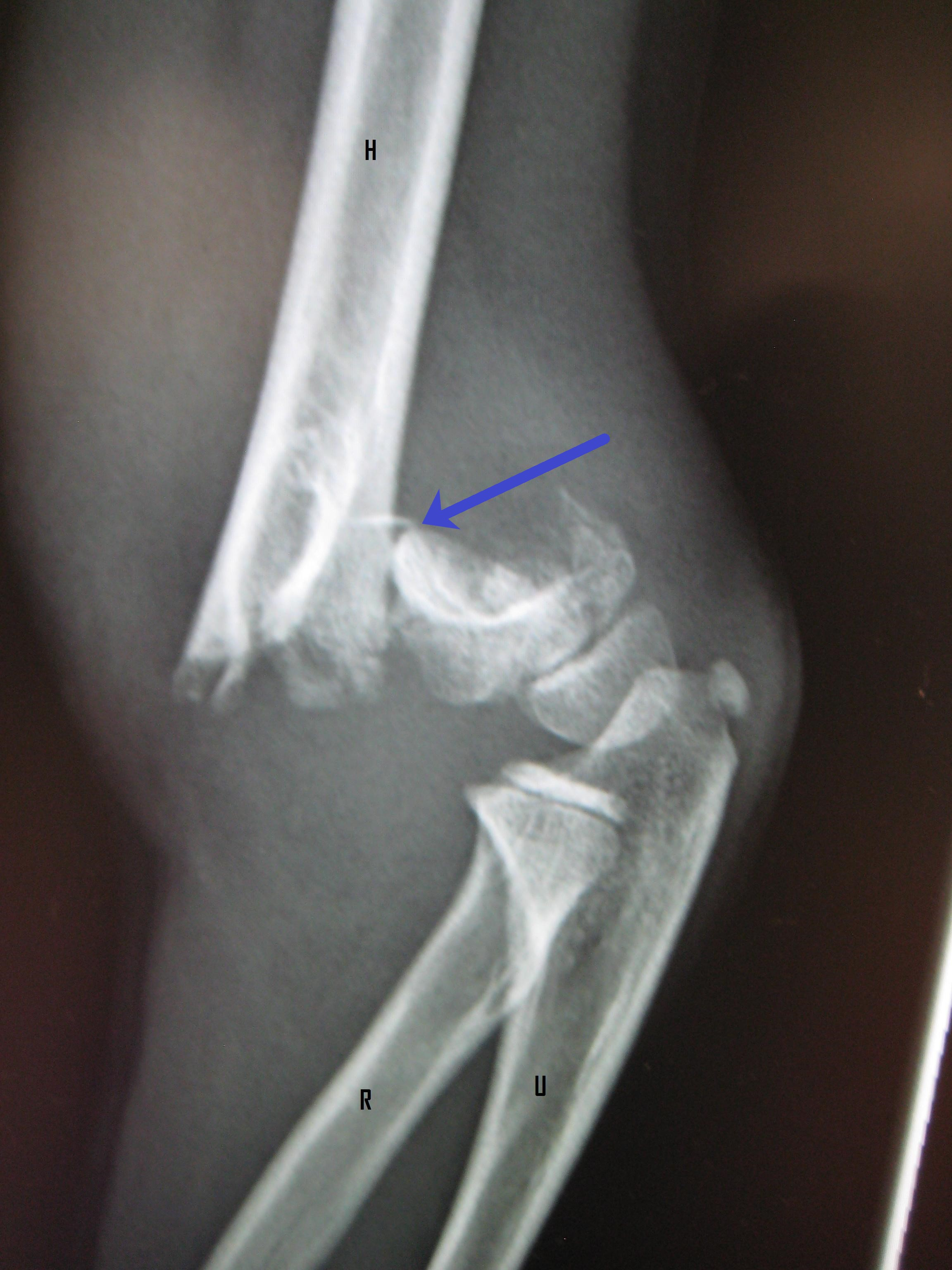
A displaced supracondylar fracture in a child

Distal humeral fractures are a group of humerus fracture which includes supracondylar fractures, single condyle fractures, bi-column fractures and coronal shear fractures.
