= Bankart repair =

- ICD-9-CM: 81.82

A Bankart repair is an operation for habitual anterior shoulder dislocation. The joint capsule is sewed to the detached glenoid labrum, without duplication of the subscapularis tendon.

The procedure is named for the Bankart lesion, a common name for the condition it addresses. The condition was named for British surgeon Arthur Sydney Blundell Bankart, who first described it in the British Medical Journal in 1923.
