= Reverse shoulder replacement =

Surgical procedure on the shoulder

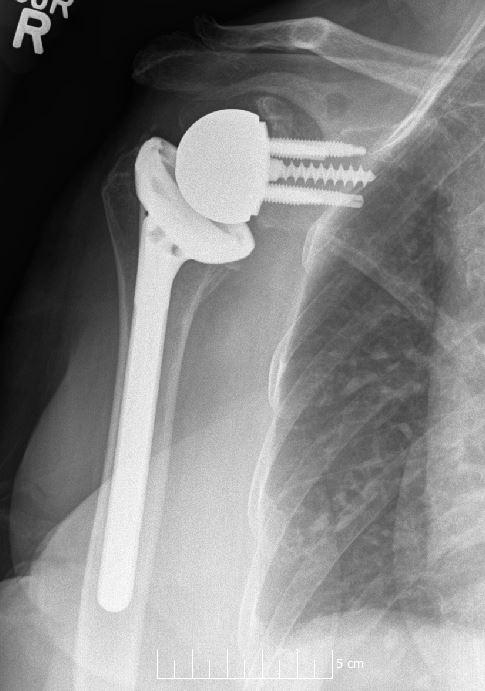
- Plain film radiograph in anteroposterior (AP) view of a right shoulder status post reverse shoulder arthroplasty using a prosthesis with a lateralized center of rotation.
- ICD-9-CM: 81.80-81.81
- MedlinePlus: 007387

Reverse shoulder replacement is a type of shoulder replacement in which the normal ball and socket relationship of glenohumeral joint is reversed, creating a more stable joint with a fixed fulcrum. This form of shoulder replacement is utilized in situations in which conventional shoulder replacement surgery would lead to poor outcomes and high failure rates.

Originally considered a salvage procedure, the combination of improved design features and excellent clinical outcome data has led to reverse shoulder replacement largely replacing shoulder hemiarthroplasty for most indications, and even challenging conventional anatomic shoulder replacement in many countries as the most commonly performed shoulder replacement procedure.

== Medical uses ==
Historically, the primary indication to perform reverse shoulder replacement was cuff tear arthropathy, which consists of advanced glenohumeral arthritis in the presence of a massive rotator cuff tear. As reverse shoulder replacement has become more popular, the indications have expanded to include shoulder "pseudoparalysis" due to massive rotator cuff tears, shoulder fractures, severe bone loss on the scapula or humerus precluding the use of standard implants and failed prior shoulder replacement procedures. More recently, reverse shoulder replacement has increasingly been used for patients with osteoarthritis with intact rotator cuff tendons, and research has shown similar outcomes to the traditional anatomical total shoulder replacement.

== Surgical techniques ==
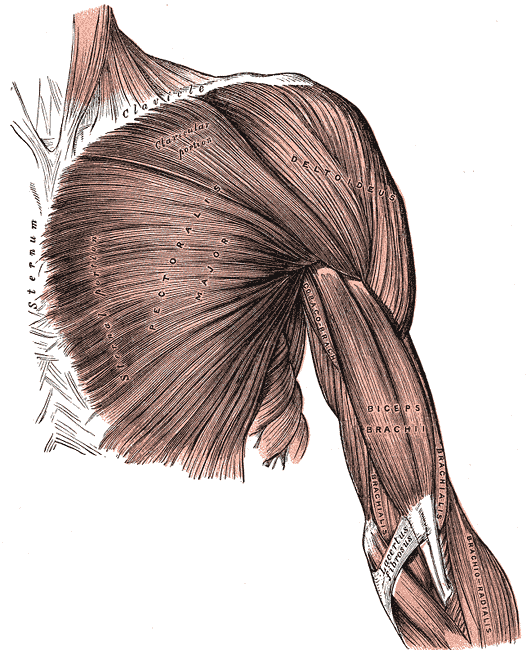
Pectoralis major muscle

The procedure is performed through a deltopectoral approach, in which the space between the deltoid muscle and pectoralis major muscle is developed. The subscapularis muscle, one of the four muscles of the rotator cuff, is typically detached to perform the operation. The native humerus and scapula bones are prepared using precise machining to accommodate their respective implants. At the end of the procedure, the subscapularis muscle is typically repaired, although some surgeons advocate not repairing this muscle due to the excess tension placed on it by the altered mechanics of the reverse shoulder design.

It is worth noting that this is an implant specific phenomenon, as certain reverse shoulder designs disrupt the normal anatomical relationships significantly while others attempt to restore these closer to what is considered normal anatomy.

=== Implants ===
Modern reverse shoulder implants consist of multiple parts. On the scapula bone, there is a metallic baseplate that grows into the bone of the native glenoid, screws and/or pegs that hold this in place, and a round metallic "glenosphere" component that is mated to the baseplate via several different mechanisms. On the humerus bone, there is typically a concave polyethylene liner that articulates with the convex glenosphere and is attached to a humeral stem that grows into the native humerus or is cemented into place. Within this basic structure there are multiple different variations of implants, and to date there is no consensus on which design is superior, although several studies have demonstrated some benefits to certain combinations.

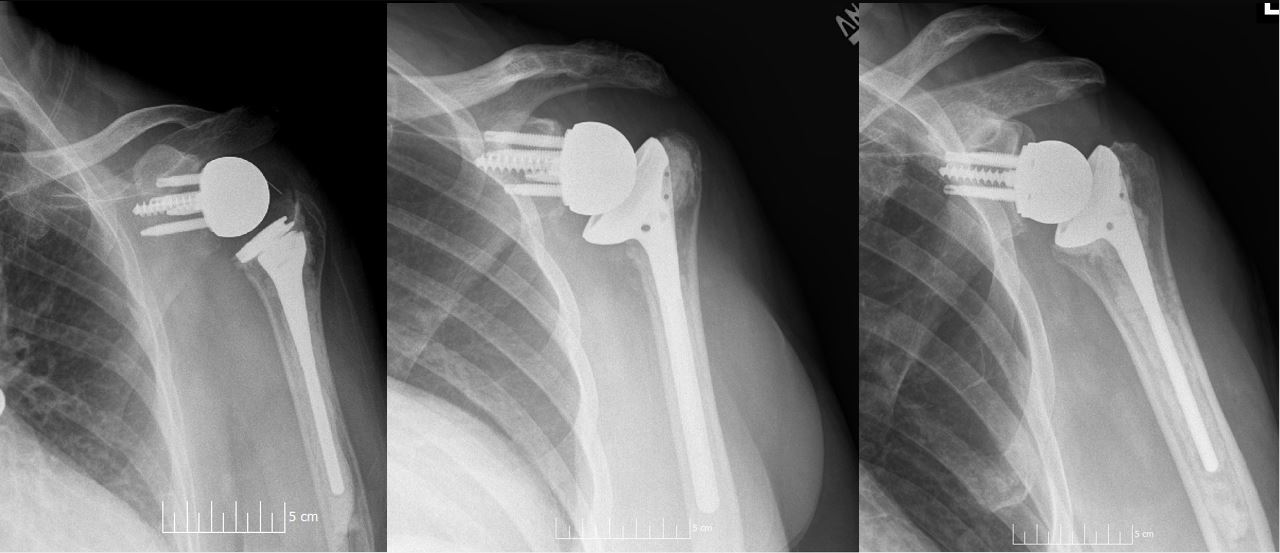
Plain film radiographs in anteroposterior (AP) view of left shoulders that are status post reverse shoulder arthroplasty using three design iterations each with a 135-degree neck-shaft angle and lateralized center of rotation.

== History ==
Traditional shoulder replacement (known as anatomic shoulder replacement) was developed to treat glenohumeral arthritis and consists of resurfacing the native humeral head and glenoid to create smooth articular surfaces to provide pain relief and improved range of motion. Variations of this procedure have been performed as early as 1883. While most patients can achieve substantial clinical improvement using this approach, those with large rotator cuff tears have consistently demonstrated poor outcomes due to loss of the stability provided by these muscles.

In 1972, U.S. orthopedic surgeon Charles S. Neer designed a fixed-fulcrum shoulder replacement in which he reversed the ball and socket geometry. His design resulted in several early failures, leading him to abandon this concept. Multiple other surgeons throughout the world subsequently developed reversed ball and socket implants, and while some achieved reasonably good results, the concept never gained significant traction until French surgeon Paul Grammont developed his "Trompette" prosthesis in 1985. This was further modified into the Delta III prosthesis in 1991. As Grammont's reverse ball and socket prosthesis gained popularity and began demonstrating reliable outcomes, he subsequently developed what would be known as the "Grammont Principles", which were a set of rules that explained why his prosthesis was effective and why other reverse ball and socket designs failed.

In 1998, U.S. orthopedic surgeon Mark Frankle began designing a reverse ball and socket prosthesis that did not adhere to the traditional Grammont Principles. He began patenting this device, the RSP (Reverse Shoulder Prosthesis), in 2002. Many doubted the effectiveness of his design and suggested that it would lead to higher failure rates, creating significant controversy and debate within the orthopedic community. After validating his theories with rigorous scientific studies and making several key modifications to his design, Frankle ultimately developed an implant that was able to address the shortcomings of the Grammont-style prostheses while also showing excellent survivorship. Multiple studies have since gone on to demonstrate the advantages of his design principles, and many of the modern generation reverse shoulder implants have mirrored them.

With good outcome in rotator cuff arthropathy, the indications for performing reverse shoulder arthroplasty has also expanded to all the situations where the rotator cuff function will be compromised such as unreconstructible fractures of proximal humerus, fracture sequelae, revision shoulder arthroplasty, shoulder instability along with arthritis and proximal humerus bone tumours.
