= Shoulder replacement =

Surgical procedure

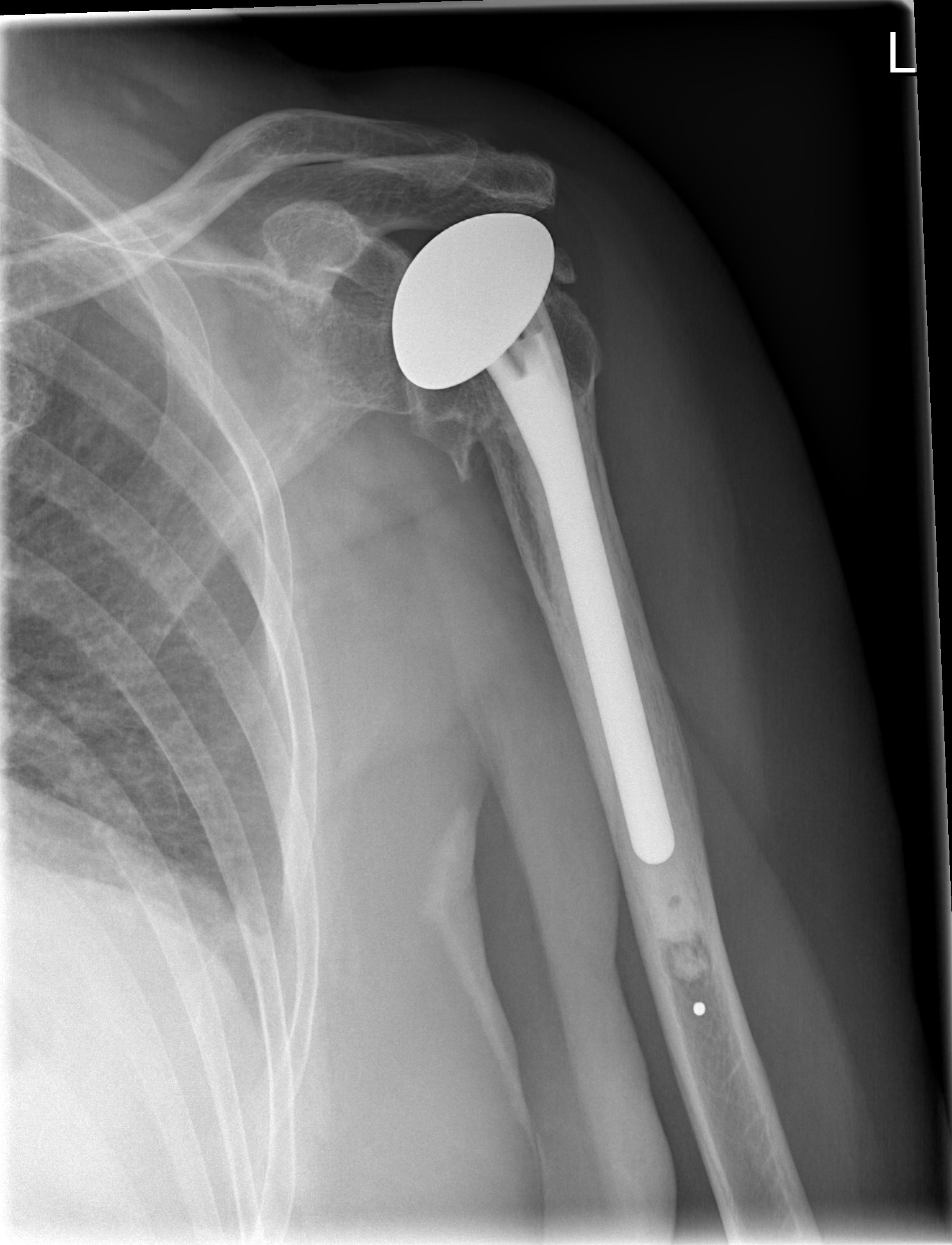
- X-ray of a shoulder prosthesis
- ICD-9-CM: 81.80-81.81
- MedlinePlus: 007387

Shoulder replacement is a surgical procedure in which all or part of the glenohumeral joint is replaced by a prosthetic implant. Such joint replacement surgery generally is conducted to relieve arthritis pain, improve joint mobility, and/or fix severe physical joint damage.

Shoulder replacement surgery is an option for treatment of severe arthritis of the shoulder joint. Arthritis is a condition that affects the cartilage of the joints. As the cartilage lining wears away, the protective lining between the bones is lost. When this happens, painful bone-on-bone arthritis develops. Severe shoulder arthritis is quite painful, and can cause restriction of motion. While this may be tolerated with some medications and lifestyle adjustments, there may come a time when surgical treatment is necessary.

Most shoulder replacements last longer than 10 years. A global study found that patients can expect large and long-lasting improvements in pain, strength, range of movement, and their ability to complete everyday tasks.

There are a few major approaches to access the shoulder joint. The first is the deltopectoral approach, which saves the deltoid, but requires the subscapularis to be cut. The second is the transdeltoid approach, which provides a straight on approach at the glenoid; however, this approach puts both the deltoid and axillary nerve at risk for potential damage.

There are different types of shoulder replacement, including anatomic and reverse total shoulder replacement. The choice of procedure depends on many factors, including the condition of the shoulder joint, the surrounding muscles and tendons, and the patients needs. Shoulder replacement can improve pain and function, but recovery will often need rehab. Complications may include infection, baseplate loosening, and need for a revision surgery.

== History ==
Until the 20th century, shoulder injuries went largely untreated, with patients left immobilized and without use of their shoulders. A series of new methods and devices during the "implant revolution" allowed surgeons to stabilize, strengthen, and improve range of motion. Shoulder replacement, also known as shoulder arthroplasty or glenohumeral arthroplasty, was pioneered by the French surgeon Jules-Émile Péan in 1893. His procedure consisted of physically smoothing the shoulder joint and implanting platinum and rubber materials. The next notable case in the evolution of shoulder replacement procedures was in 1955 when Charles Neer conducted the first hemiarthroplasty, essentially replacing only the humeral head, leaving the natural shoulder socket, or glenoid, intact. This procedure grew exponentially in popularity as time progressed; however, patients often developed cartilage loss on their glenoid surface as well, leading to pain and glenoid erosion. This prompted the development of a procedure to replace not only the humeral component, but the glenoid component as well.

Throughout the development of the procedures, it became well accepted that the rotator cuff muscles were essential to producing the best outcomes in terms of strength, range of motion, and a decrease in pain. In addition to this finding, physical constraints of the normal ball-and-socket anatomy of the shoulder limited most developments in one way or another. For example, a heavily constrained system limited range of motion, and the inherent anatomy of the glenoid proved difficult to cement prosthetics and fixate components without fracturing it. These challenges and high rates of failure led to the development of the reverse total shoulder arthroplasty to overcome the limitations imposed by the natural shoulder anatomy.

The 1970s saw an exponential increase in surgical approaches using this methodology, and the number and variation of surgical techniques are many. However, in 1985 Paul Grammont emerged with a superior technique that is the basis for most reverse shoulder replacement procedures today. However, it is of note that the reverse shoulder replacement is primarily indicated in cases in which a patient has weak or torn rotator cuff muscles. In others, a conventional shoulder replacement may be indicated. Although Grammont continued to develop and refine his new technique to address minor complications that arose, it relied on four basic concepts that included the inherent stability and shape of the implant, as well as the placement of the implant relative to the natural glenohumeral joint.

== Indications ==
The progression to shoulder replacement usually begins with the development of pain with movement of the shoulder and stiffness which will be conservatively managed with activity modification, physical therapy and nonsteroidal anti-inflammatory (NSAID) drugs. Additionally, intra-articular corticosteroid injections (injection into the joint space) are another popular, conservative option. If all non-surgical, conservative treatment options fail and pain is affecting quality of life, then the shoulder replacement will likely be indicated. Various studies on shoulder replacements have confirmed this indication, noting specifically that severe glenohumeral arthritis as the cause. Osteoarthritis, a common cause for shoulder replacement, is when the cartilage covering the joint gradually wears, resulting in less lubrication as well as softening of impact between joint articulation.

The reverse total shoulder arthroplasty (RTSA) was developed in the 1980s as a treatment for rotator cuff tear arthropathy in the elderly. It has demonstrated excellent clinical outcomes and thus has become well-established as the treatment of choice for cuff tear arthropathy. National joint registries have reported 10-year survivorship for the diagnosis of rotator cuff arthropathy of 94.1%. Increasing surgeon experience with the reverse prosthesis has seen a decrease in complications and a change in the indications for surgery. An early expanded indication was primary osteoarthritis with loss of rotator cuff function. Massive irreparable rotator cuff tear without osteoarthritis has also been an accepted indication for a number of years, given numerous studies have reported good functional outcomes. Over the last 10 years the indications for RTSA have seen a huge expansion, including for patients with osteoarthritis and intact rotator cuff tendons. Indications also include posterior glenoid deficiency, fracture, tumour and revision surgery.

== Surgical techniques ==
In traditional total shoulder arthroplasty the approach begins with separating the deltoid muscle from the pectoral muscles, facilitating access to the shoulder (glenohumeral) joint through a relatively nerve free passageway. The shoulder joint is initially covered by the rotator cuff muscles (subscapularis, supraspinatus, infraspinatus and teres minor) and the joint capsule (glenohumeral ligaments). Typically a single rotator cuff muscle is identified and cut to allow direct access to the shoulder joint. As this point, the surgeon can remove the arthritic portions of the joint and then secure the ball and socket prostheses within the joint.

The development of safer, more effective techniques have led to the increased use of reverse total shoulder arthroplasty. Reverse total shoulder arthroplasties are typically indicated when the rotator cuff muscles are severely damaged. There are a few major approaches for reverse total shoulder arthroplasties. The first is the deltopectoral approach, which is the approach described above for the traditional total shoulder arthroplasty. This approach saves the deltoid, but requires the supraspinatus to be cut. The second is the transdeltoid approach, which provides a straight on approach at the glenoid. However, during this approach the deltoid is put at risk for potential damage. Both techniques are used, depending on the surgeon's preferences.

=== For osteoarthritis and rotator cuff tear arthropathy ===
The latest systematic reviews suggests (with low quality evidence) that total shoulder arthroplasty does not provide important benefits over hemiarthroplasty for glenohumeral osteoarthritis and rotator cuff tears. It highlighted the current lack of high-quality evidence and need for randomized controlled trials.

== Implants ==
Various materials can be used to make prostheses, however the majority consist of a metal ball that rotates within a polyethylene (plastic) socket. The metal ball takes the place of the patient's humeral head and is anchored via a stem, which is inserted down the shaft of the humerus. The plastic socket is placed over the patient's glenoid and is typically secured to the surrounding bone via cement.

Recent advances in technology have led to the development of short-stem, stemless, as well as cementless humeral replacement components being used in the operating room. The glenoid implant technology has also seen advances which have led to the reduction of rocking-horse effect and glenoid implant loosening. In addition, the increasing popularity of reverse total shoulder arthroplasty has led to availability of 29 new prostheses in 2016 alone.

== Long-term outcomes and implant survival ==
Undergoing a shoulder replacement can lead to good long-term outcomes, with survival of the shoulder implant over time. However, some patients may eventually require another operation, known as revision surgery.

In a 2026 systematic review and meta-analysis examining the long-term survival of anatomic and reverse shoulder arthroplasty using 7 studies and data from 4 national joint replacement registries, researchers found that at 15 years, 90.8% of anatomic replacements and 90.7% of reverse replacements had not required revision surgery.

Lack of revision surgery and implant survival does not necessarily mean there was no pain or limitation in shoulder movement.

=== Return to activities ===
An important consideration is the return to activities following a shoulder replacement. Although recovery may vary by procedure and individual circumstances, many patients may return to sports. A 2025 systematic review found that 91% of patients were able to return to sports following an anatomic total shoulder replacement, this is compared to 80% following a reverse replacement. Return to work was also found to be 76% and 46% respectively. These differences don't mean one operation is preferable to the other, as demographics and pre-operative shoulder conditions differ for which procedure is selected.

Another systematic review on reverse shoulder replacements found that 85.1% of patients returned to sports on some level, however, few patients returned to their previous level of participation. This was largely don't as an observational study involving older adults.

== Risks ==
Non surgery options are preferred treatment for a variety of reasons. Besides not wanting to risk the usual risks of surgery such as infection, shoulder replacement can lead to a variety of complications including rotator cuff tear and glenohumeral instability. However, despite these risks, shoulder replacement shows promise with a low rate of complication which depending on the type of surgery is close to 5%. Patients having their procedure by surgeons who perform more than 10 shoulder replacements per year are less likely to need a subsequent revision surgery than if their surgeon performs fewer. An externally validated prediction model to estimate the risk of serious adverse events after shoulder replacement surgery has recently become available. Despite some healthcare providers restricting surgery to patients under certain body mass index (BMI) thresholds, there is evidence to suggest patients with obesity do not have worse outcomes after shoulder replacement surgery.

== Recovery and rehabilitation ==
Post operative rehabilitation following a shoulder replacement focuses on movement, strength, and the ability to perform daily activities. Plan of recovery depends on the type of replacement, as well as personal surgical considerations.

When comparing starting shoulder movement early after a reverse shoulder replacement, with relaying rehab, a 2026 systematic review found that early movement improved forward arm elevation at six weeks. However, evidence did not support an advantage in long term function.

Supervised outpatient physical therapy when compared to structured home based rehab showed similar functional and pain outcomes at one year.

=== Implant failure and revision surgery ===
Implant loosening, rotator cuff damage, instability, infection, and other complications may result in the failure of a shoulder replacement. Implant loosening was found as the most common cause of failure in a 2025 systematic review of anatomic total shoulder replacements. Rotator cuff insufficiency, instability, and infection were also found to be important causes.

In the case of failure of an anatomic shoulder replacement, a decision surgery to a reverse shoulder may be considered. In a 2025 systematic review of 730 patients, there was found to be improvement of pain and function following the revision to reverse.

== Anesthesiological considerations ==
Regional and general anesthesia are two methods that can be utilized when performing shoulder replacement. One example of a commonly used regional anesthetic is an interscalene brachial plexus block and it has been used in a number of shoulder procedures including instability repairs, proximal humeral prosthetic replacements, total shoulder arthroplasties, anterior acromioplasties, rotator cuff repairs, and operative treatment of humeral fractures. The benefits of utilizing regional anesthesia over general anesthesia include less intraoperative bleeding, more muscle relaxation, shorter recovery room and hospital stays, decreased use of opioids, and avoiding the side effects of general anesthesia. In addition, regional anesthesia may be more cost-effective because it reduces operating room turnover time and procedure time due to the patients waking up sooner after surgery.

The success rate of placing an interscalene brachial plexus block ranges from 84% to 98% according to some case studies. Major complications such as seizures, cardiac arrests, Horner's syndrome, hoarseness, and inadvertent spinal/epidural anesthesia could occur and therefore, patients should be carefully monitored during the insertion of the block until the end of the surgery. Currently, data on combined usage of general anesthesia and interscalene blocks are limited. Some indications for combined anesthesia include difficult airway management and longer surgical procedures.

A mixture of short and long-acting local anesthetics is used to prolong the duration as well as reduce the onset of the nerve block. Lidocaine is an appropriate short-acting local anesthetic and drugs such as levobupivacaine or ropivacaine are appropriate long-acting local anesthetics. The amount of drugs needed for a patient during shoulder replacement can range from 30 to 50 ml and is calculated based on the patient's characteristics as well as the specific anesthetic technique used.

=== Post-operative analgesia ===
Shoulder replacement can cause severe to very severe pain especially during shoulder mobilization and therefore, postoperative pain management is extremely important for recovery. This is because joint tissues are well innervated from nociceptive input and therefore, a surgical procedure in the joint region would produce continuous deep somatic pain as well as muscle spasms.

The following anesthetics are methods commonly used to assist with post-operative shoulder replacement pain management:

==== Interscalenic analgesia ====
Three types:

1. Single-shot
2. Continuous-infusion
3. Patient-controlled

Single-shot interscalenic analgesia is preferably used during minor arthroscopic surgery because of its short duration but overall, it is still a useful alternative when continuous interscalenic analgesia cannot be performed. Interscalenic analgesia is most suited for the continuous infusion approach because shoulder replacement causes severe post-operative pain and the anatomic proximity of the interscalenic catheter to the shoulder joint provides quick relief. The interscalenic catheter can be used from three to five days depending on the type of surgery.

==== Suprascapular combined with local anesthetic ====
Since the suprascapular nerve provides sensory information to 70% of the joint capsule, blocking this nerve can help with post-operative shoulder pain. A nerve stimulator, ultrasound device, or a needle insertion that is 1 cm above the midpoint of the scapular spine can quickly block the suprascapular nerve. Furthermore, blocking the axillary nerve together with the suprascapular nerve can further anesthetize the shoulder joint. The benefit of the suprascapular nerve block is that it avoids blocking motor function to parts of the upper limb innervated by the more inferior roots of the brachial plexus (C8-T1), which thus prevents the phrenic nerve from being blocked. Disadvantages to the suprascapular nerve block include using two separate needlings, blocking not all of nerves of the shoulder joint, and short duration of action. Some side effects for the procedure include pneumothorax, intravascular injection, and nerve damage. Although this technique provides more pain control compared to placebo, the technique is still inferior to the interscalene block.
