= Sling (medicine) =

Device to limit arm movement

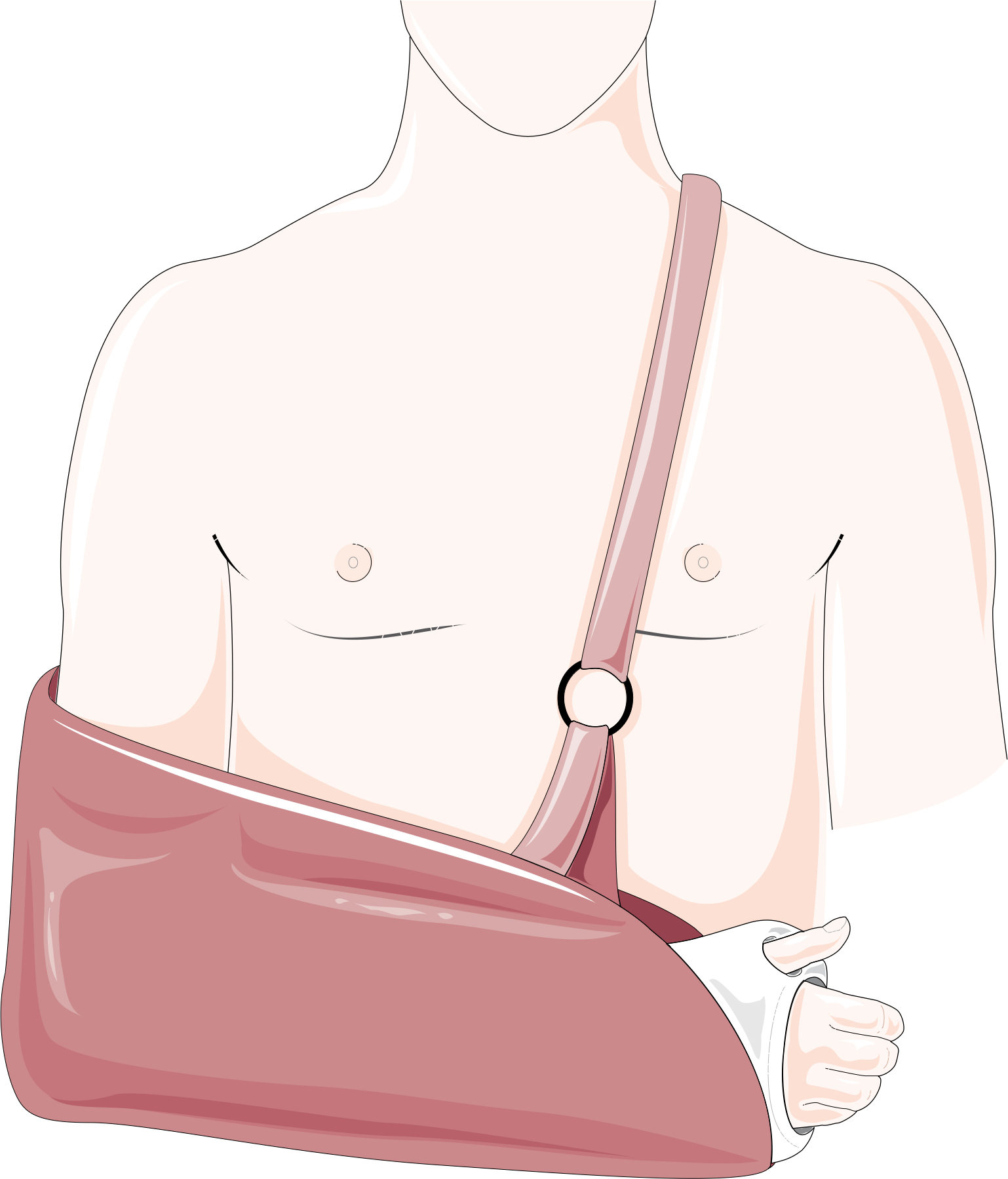
- An arm sling on a person's right hand
- Other names: Arm sling

Illustration of the sling-and-swathe technique for treating an arm fracture

A sling or arm sling is a device to limit movement of the shoulder and elbow, or protect the hand while an injury heals, made of cloth or a similar material. The sling normally holds the forearm against the body, horizontally or higher. A triangular bandage or simply a strip of cloth may be used as a sling. Various purpose-made slings are available, ranging from simple strips to felt slings made to cushion the arm from elbow to wrist, with a neck strap, often using hook-and-loop fasteners on a felt body.

== Types ==
Sling types include:

- High arm
- Collar and cuff
- Broad arm

== Indications ==
Common clinical indications:

- Dislocated shoulder: the head of the humerus is detached from the glenoid fossa
- Clavicle fracture: partial or complete break of the clavicle bone
- Acromioclavicular separation: injury to the acromioclavicular joint
- Shoulder sprains

== Risks ==
Prolonged shoulder sling use could lead to a frozen shoulder.

== See also ==
- Splint (medicine)
