= Dislocated shoulder =

Injury

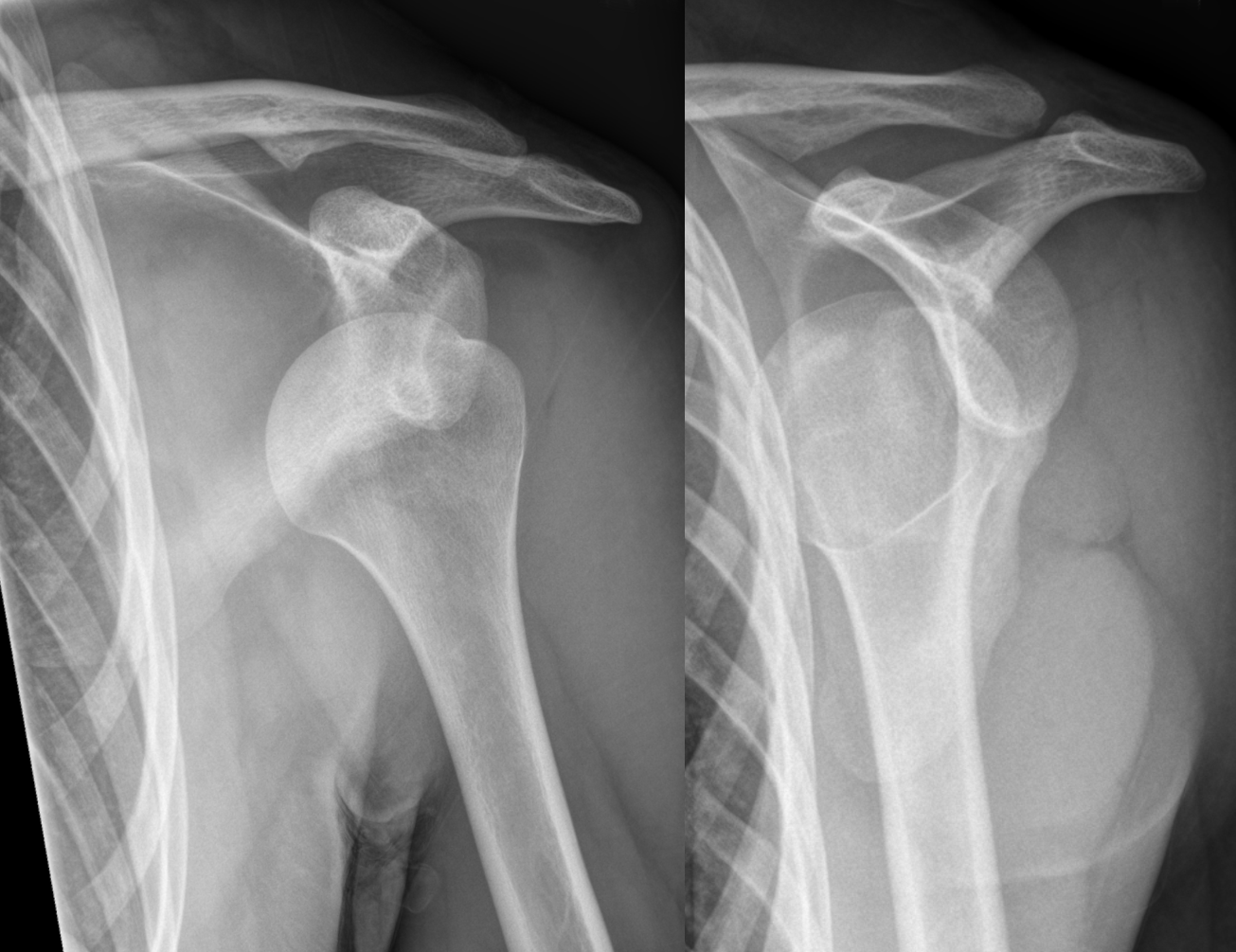
- Anterior dislocation of the left shoulder.
- Specialty: Emergency medicine, orthopedics
- Symptoms: Shoulder pain
- Complications: Bankart lesion, Hill-Sachs lesion, rotator cuff tear, axillary nerve injury
- Types: Anterior, posterior, inferior, superior
- Causes: Extreme rotation, traumatic impact
- Diagnostic method: Based on symptoms, X-rays
- Treatment: Shoulder reduction, arm sling
- Medication: Procedural sedation and analgesia, intraarticular lidocaine
- Prognosis: Recurrence common in young people
- Frequency: 24 per 100,000 per year (US)

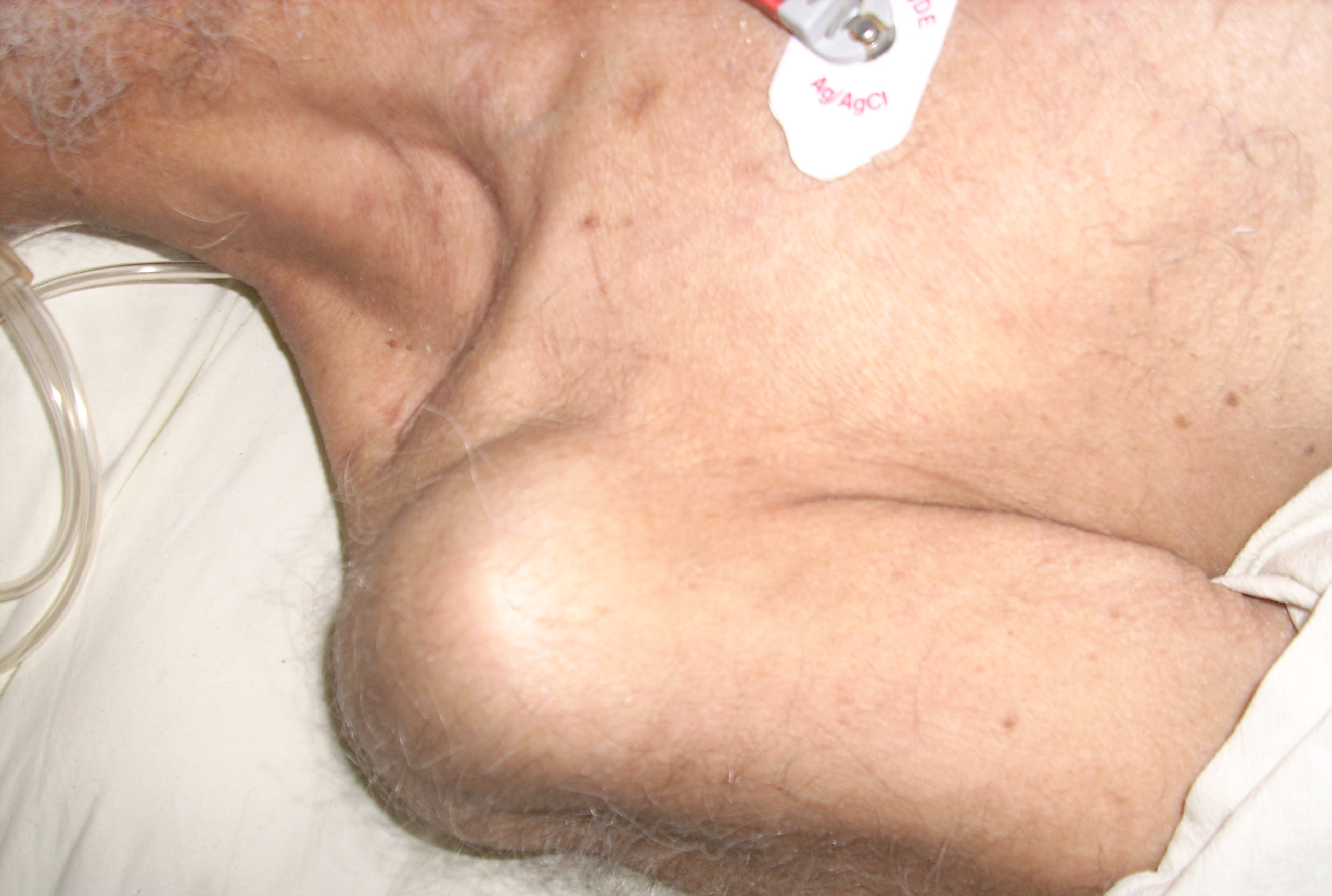
Anterior shoulder dislocation while carrying a frail elder

A dislocated shoulder is a condition in which the head of the humerus is detached from the glenoid fossa. The shoulder is the most commonly dislocated joint in the human body, comprising 50% of all joint dislocations. Symptoms include shoulder pain and instability.

There are multiple types of shoulder dislocation, with anterior dislocation being by far the most common, comprising 97% of all shoulder dislocations. Less common types includes posterior (2-4% of all shoulder dislocations) and inferior shoulder dislocation (<1% of all shoulder dislocations), as these latter types tend to involve a traumatic accident and/or impact. Shoulder dislocations can also be divided into subluxation (partial dislocation) or full dislocation.

== Causes and diagnosis ==
Common causes of anterior shoulder dislocation include extreme rotation, particularly abduction and external rotation of the shoulder. Athletes playing sports that involve overhead extension such as swimming and tennis are susceptible for shoulder dislocation. Diagnosis is typically made based on symptoms and may be confirmed by X-rays.

== Complications ==
Complications may include a Bankart lesion, Hill-Sachs lesion, rotator cuff tear, or injury to the axillary nerve. Severe shoulder dislocations can be complicated by fracture of surrounding bones.

Treatment is by shoulder reduction which may be accomplished by a number of techniques. These include traction-countertraction, external rotation, scapular manipulation, and the Stimson technique. After reduction X-rays are recommended for verification. The arm may then be placed in a sling for a few weeks. Surgery may be recommended in those with recurrent dislocations.

Not all patients require surgery following a shoulder dislocation. There is moderate quality evidence that patients who receive physical therapy after an acute shoulder dislocation will not experience recurrent dislocations. It has been shown that patients who do not receive surgery after a shoulder dislocation do not experience recurrent dislocations within two years of the initial injury.

About 1.7% of people have a shoulder dislocation within their lifetime. In the United States this is about 24 per 100,000 people per year. They make up about half of major joint dislocations seen in emergency departments. Males are affected more often than females. Most shoulder dislocations occur as a result of sports injuries.

== Signs and symptoms ==
- Significant pain, sometimes felt along the arm past the shoulder.
- Sensation that the shoulder is slipping out of the joint during abduction and external rotation.
- Shoulder and arm held in external rotation (anterior dislocation), or adduction and internal rotation (posterior dislocation). Resistance of all movement.
- Numbness of the arm.
- Visibly displaced shoulder. Some dislocations result in the shoulder appearing unusually square.
- No palpable bone on the side of the shoulder.

== Diagnosis ==
A diagnosis of shoulder dislocation is often suspected based on the person's history and physical examination. Radiographs are made to confirm the diagnosis. Most dislocations are apparent on radiographs showing incongruence of the glenohumeral joint. Posterior dislocations may be hard to detect on standard AP radiographs, but are more readily detected on other views. After reduction, radiographs are usually repeated to confirm successful reduction and to detect bone damage. After repeated shoulder dislocations, an MRI scan may be used to assess soft tissue damage. In regards to recurrent dislocations, the apprehension test (anterior instability) and sulcus sign (inferior instability) are useful methods for determining predisposition to future dislocation.

There are three main types of dislocations: anterior, posterior, and inferior.

=== Anterior (forward) ===
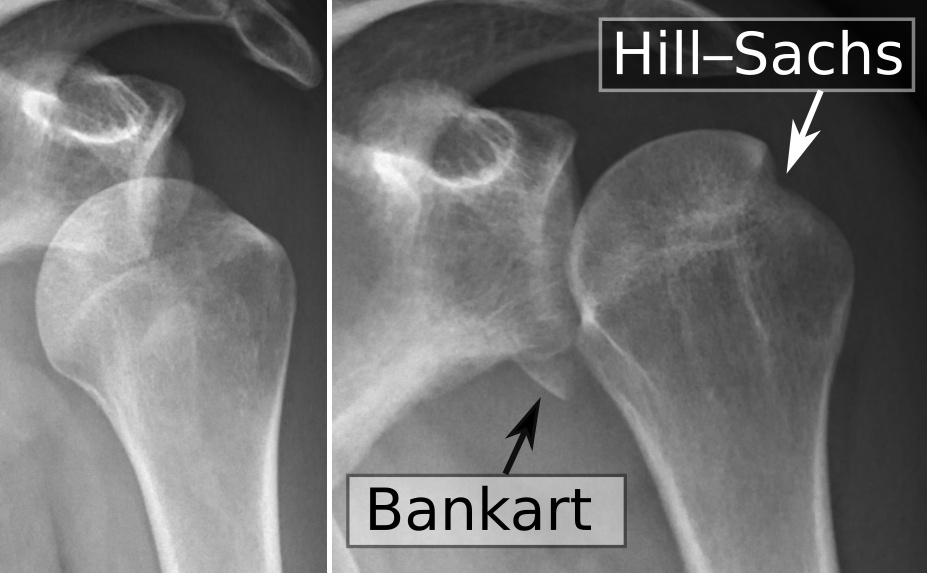
X-ray at left shows anterior dislocation in a young man. X-ray at right shows the same shoulder after reduction and internal rotation, revealing a Bankart lesion and a Hill-Sachs lesion.

In over 95% of shoulder dislocations, the humerus is displaced anteriorly. In most of those, the head of the humerus comes to rest under the coracoid process, referred to as sub-coracoid dislocation. Sub-glenoid, subclavicular, and, very rarely, intrathoracic or retroperitoneal dislocations may also occur.

Anterior dislocations are usually caused by a direct blow to, or fall on, an outstretched arm. The person typically holds his/her arm externally rotated and slightly abducted.

A Hill–Sachs lesion is an impaction of the head of the humerus left by the glenoid rim during dislocation. Hill-Sachs deformities occur in 35–40% of anterior dislocations. They can be seen on a front-facing X-ray when the arm is in internal rotation. Bankart lesions are disruptions of the glenoid labrum with or without an avulsion of bone fragment.

Damage to the axillary artery and axillary nerve (C5, C6) may result. The axillary nerve is injured in 37% making it the most commonly injured structure with this type of injury. Other common, associated, nerve injuries include injury to the suprascapular nerve (29%) and the radial nerve (22%). Axillary nerve damage results in a weakened or paralyzed deltoid muscle and as the deltoid atrophies unilaterally, the normal rounded contour of the shoulder is lost. A person with injury to the axillary nerve will have difficulty in abducting the arm from approximately 15° away from the body. The supraspinatus muscle initiates abduction from a fully adducted position.

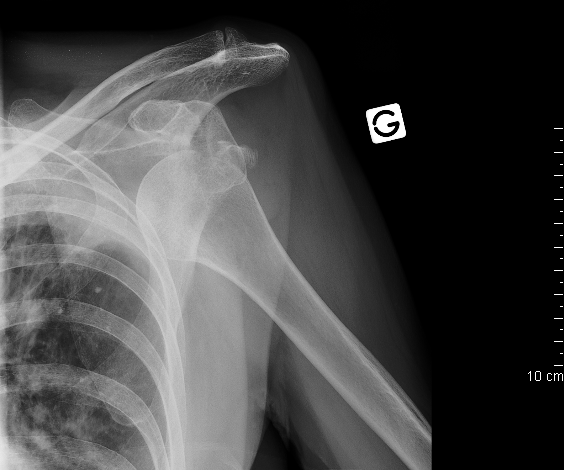
An anterior dislocation of the shoulder

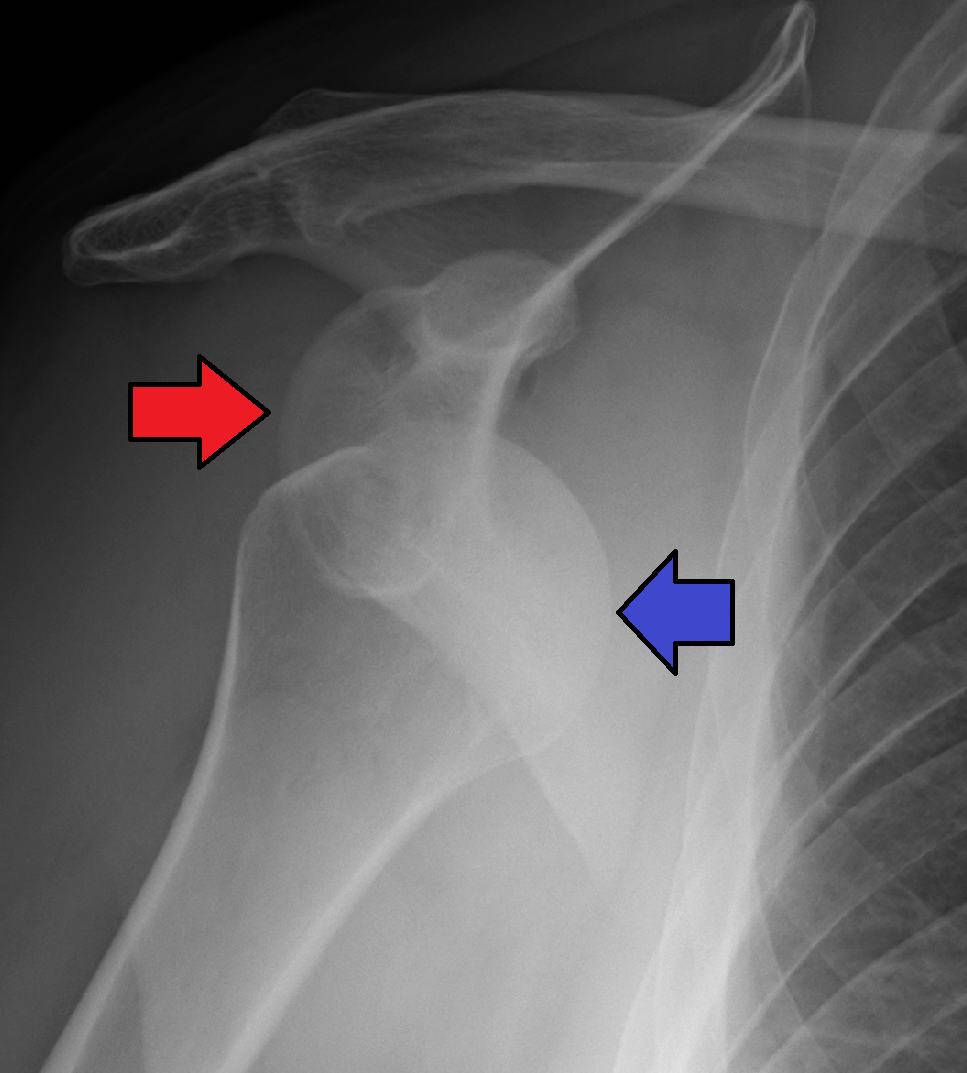
Anterior dislocation of the right shoulder. AP X ray

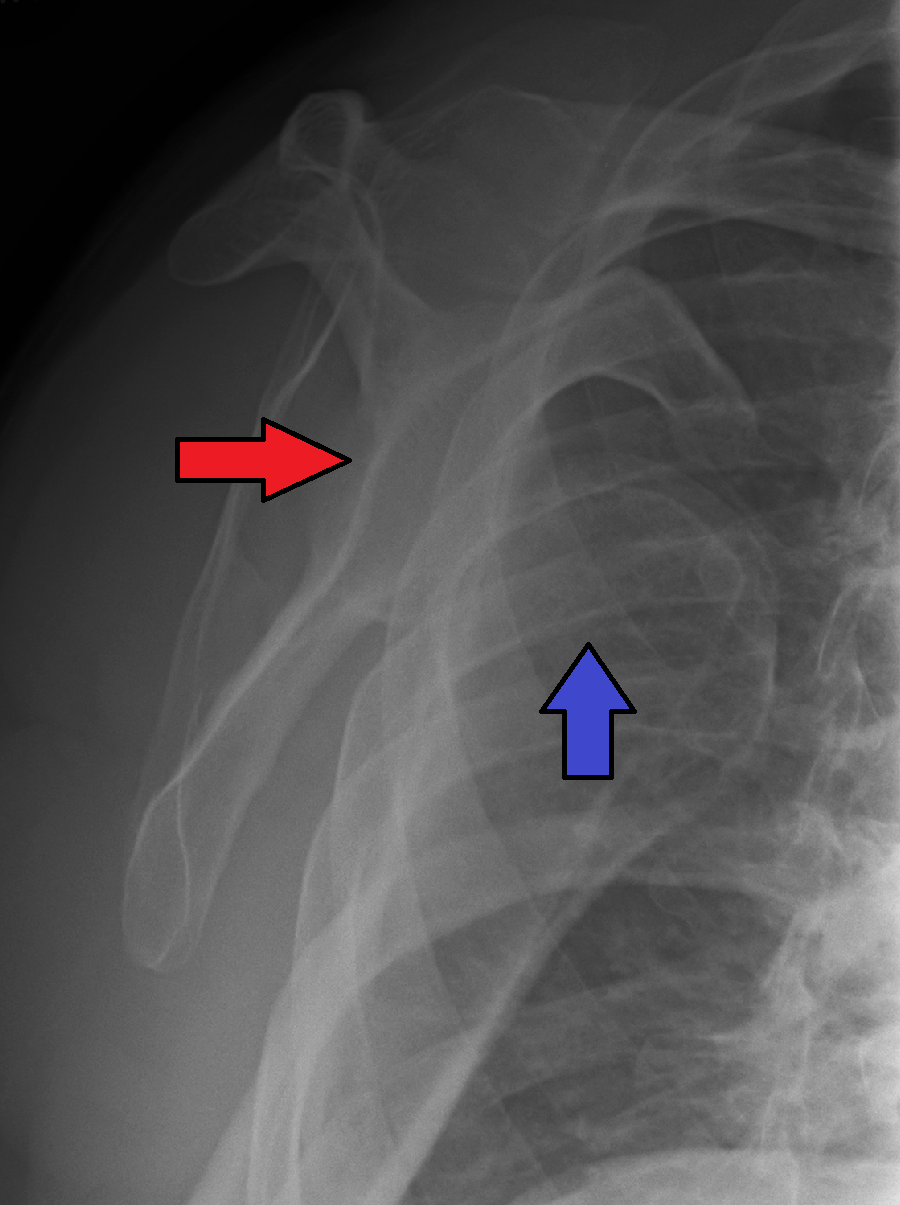
Anterior dislocation of the right shoulder. Y view X ray.

=== Posterior (backward) ===
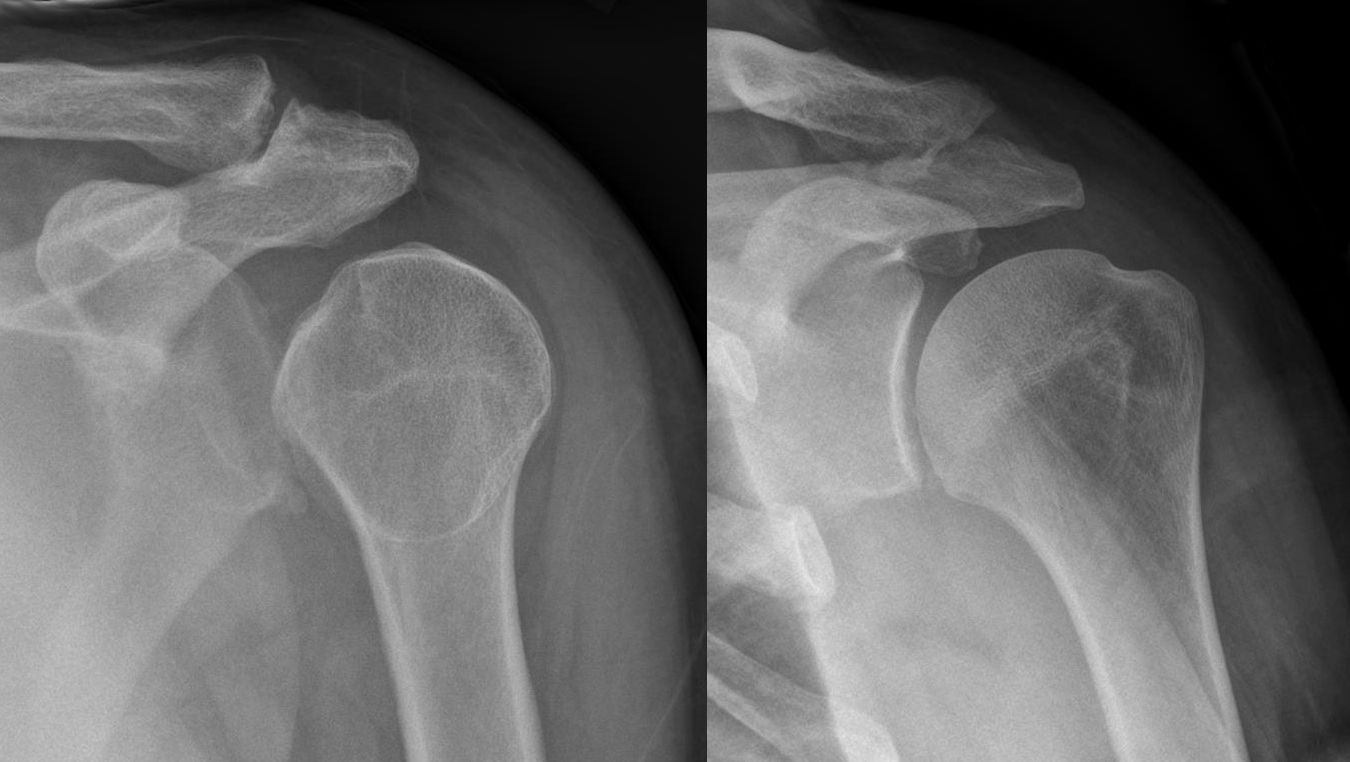
Lightbulb sign indicative of posterior shoulder dislocation shown on the left. On the right, the same shoulder after reduction.

Posterior dislocations are uncommon, and are typically due to the muscle contraction from electric shock or seizure. They may be caused by strength imbalance of the rotator cuff muscles. People with dislocated shoulders typically present holding their arm internally rotated and adducted, and exhibiting flattening of the anterior shoulder with a prominent coracoid process.

Posterior dislocations may go unrecognized, especially in an elderly person and in people who are in the state of unconscious trauma. An average interval of 1 year was noted between injury and diagnosis in a series of 40 people.

=== Inferior (downward) ===
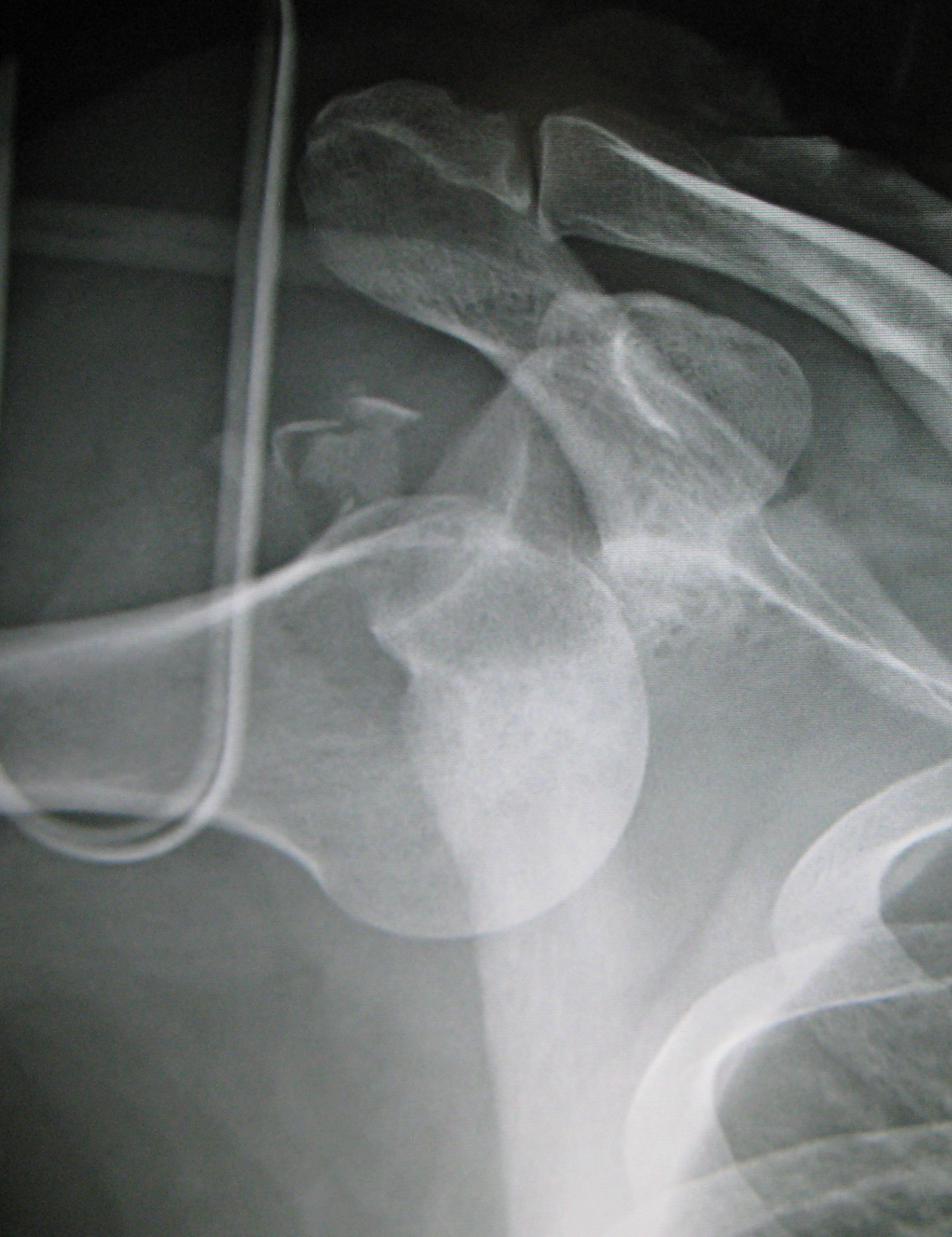
An inferior dislocation of the shoulder after an automobile accident. Note how the humerus is abducted. Also present is a fracture of the greater tuberosity.

Inferior dislocation is the least likely, occurring in less than 1%. This condition is also called luxatio erecta because the arm appears to be permanently held upward or behind the head. It is caused by a hyper abduction of the arm that forces the humeral head against the acromion. Such injuries have a high complication rate as many vascular, neurological, tendon, and ligament injuries are likely to occur from this mechanism of injury.

== Treatment ==
Prompt medical treatment should be sought for suspected dislocation. Usually, the shoulder is kept in its current position by use of a splint or sling. A pillow between the arm and torso may provide support and increase comfort. Strong analgesics are needed to allay the pain of a dislocation and the distress associated with it.

=== Reduction ===
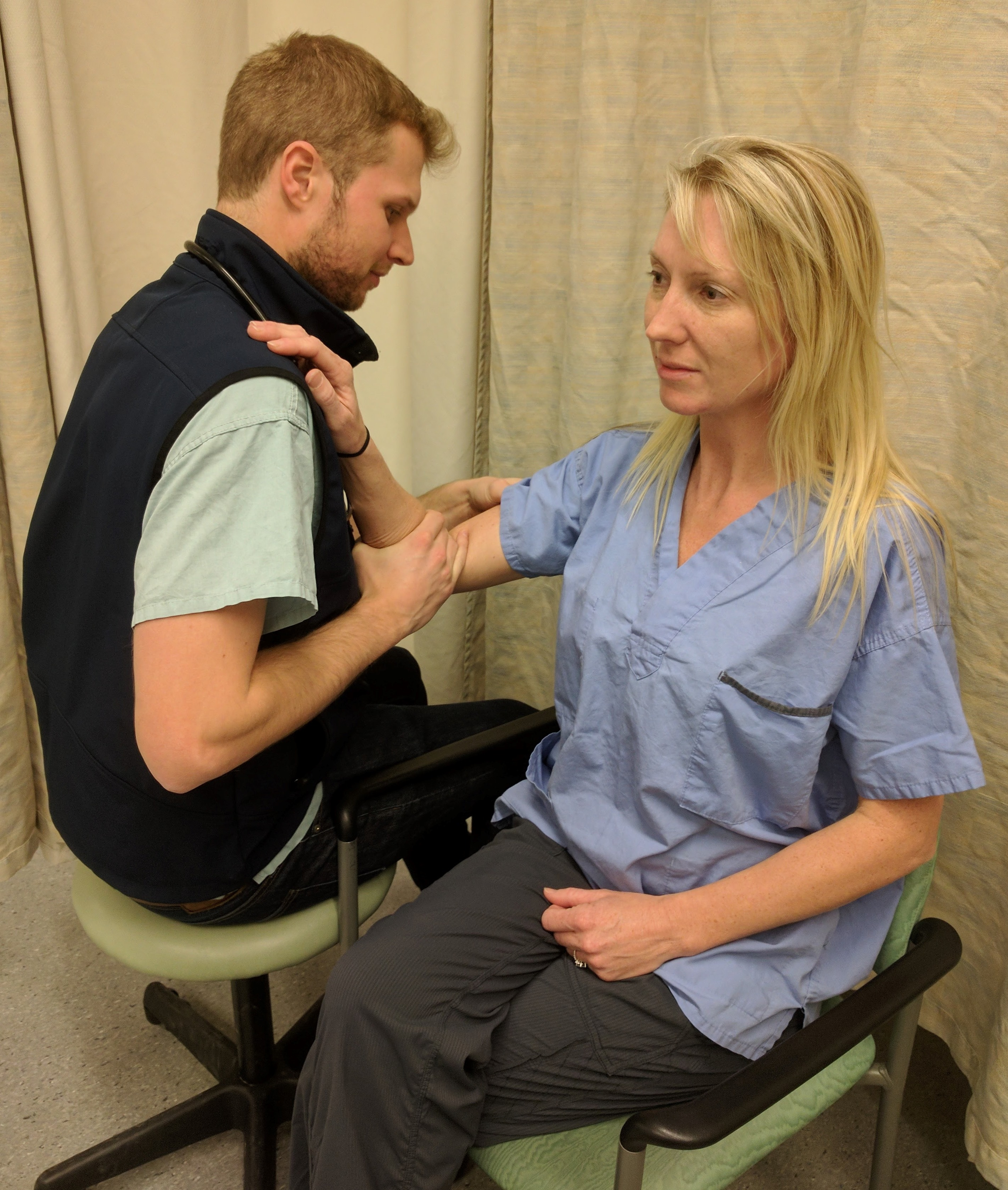
An example of a shoulder reduction technique, specifically the Cunningham technique

There are multiple techniques that can be used to reduce an anteriorly dislocated shoulder, including both clinician-directed and self-reducing techniques.

Clinician-directed techniques include the Scapular Manipulation, External Rotation, Cunningham, Milch, Traction, Spaso, Fares, Fulcrum, Kocher's, Hippocratic, and Posterior Shoulder Reduction.

Self-reducing techniques include the Stimson technique, which involves the patient laying prone with the affected arm dangling over the edge of an elevated surface, such as a table, with a 5-15 pound weight in hand, which usually results in reduction within 30 minutes. Other methods include bending the knee on the same side of the dislocated shoulder at 90º, wrapping the hands around the kneecap, and shrugging the shoulders forward until the affected shoulder pops back into place.

Pain can be managed during the procedures either by procedural sedation and analgesia or injected lidocaine into the shoulder joint. Injecting lidocaine into the joint may be less expensive and faster. If a shoulder cannot be relocated in the emergency room, relocation in the operating room may be required. This situation occurs in about 7% of cases.

Stimson procedure is the least painful, widely used shoulder reduction technique. In this procedure a weight is attached to the wrist while the injured arm is hanging off an examination table for between 20 and 30 minutes. The arm is then slowly rotated until the shoulder is relocated. Sedatives are used in Stimson procedure and first time Stimson reduction for acute shoulder dislocation requires wearing arm slings for between 2 and 4 weeks.

=== Post-reduction ===
There is no strong evidence of a difference in outcomes when the arm is immobilized in internal versus external rotation following an anterior shoulder dislocation. A 2008 study of 300 people for almost six years found that conventional shoulder immobilisation in a sling offered no benefit.

=== Surgery ===
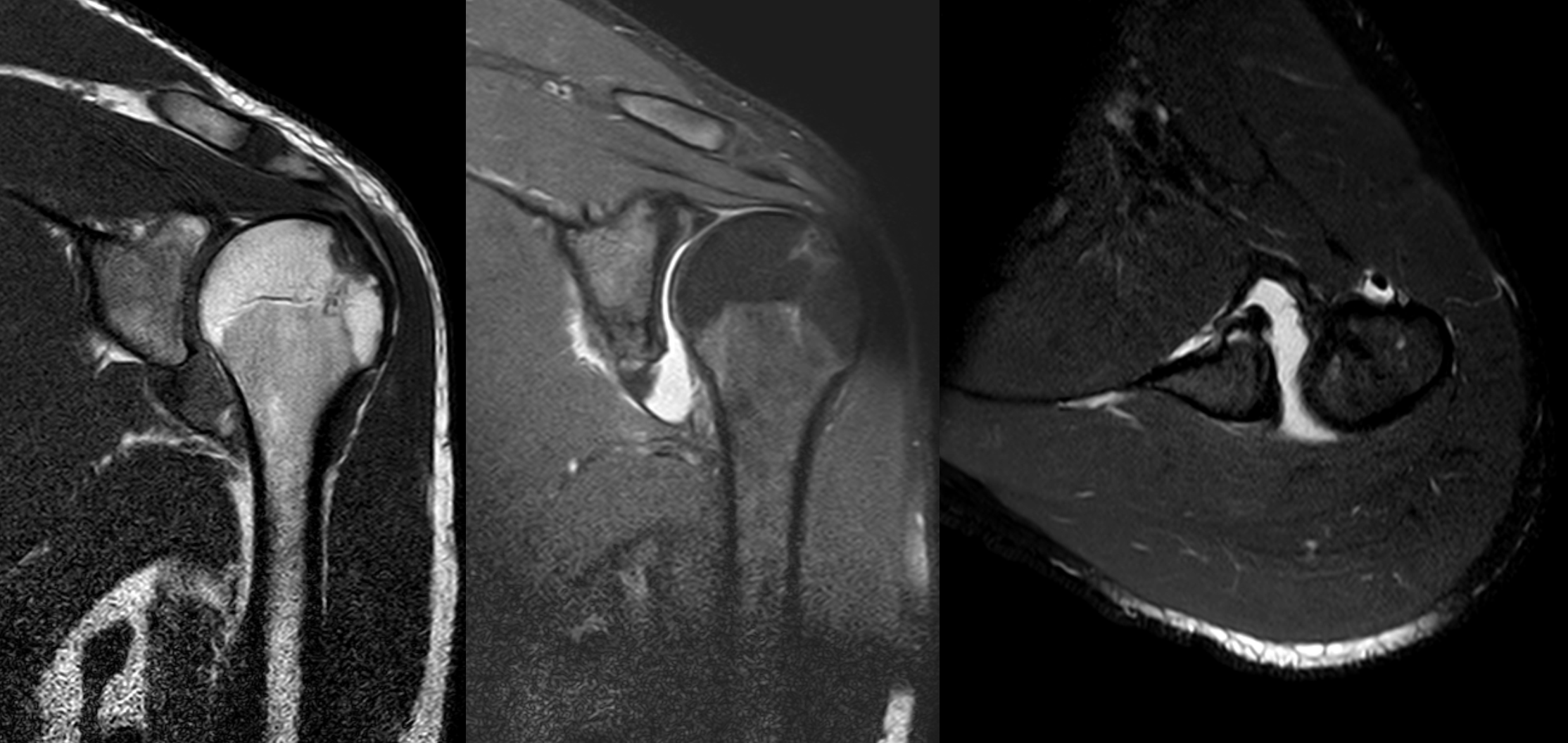
MRI of shoulder after dislocation with Hill-Sachs lesion and labral Bankart's lesion.

In young adults engaged in highly demanding activities shoulder surgery may be considered. Arthroscopic surgery techniques may be used to repair the glenoidal labrum, capsular ligaments, biceps long head anchor or SLAP lesion or to tighten the shoulder capsule.

Arthroscopic stabilization surgery has evolved from the Bankart repair, a time-honored surgical treatment for recurrent anterior instability of the shoulder. However, the failure rate following Bankart repair has been shown to increase markedly in people with significant bone loss from the glenoid (socket). In such cases, improved results have been reported with some form of bone augmentation of the glenoid such as the Latarjet operation.

Although posterior dislocation is much less common, instability following it is no less challenging and, again, some form of bone augmentation may be required to control instability. Damaged ligaments, including labral tears, occurring as a result of posterior dislocations may be treated arthroscopically.

There remains those situations characterized by multidirectional instability, which have failed to respond satisfactorily to rehabilitation, falling under the AMBRI classification previously noted. This is usually due to an overstretched and redundant capsule which no longer offers stability or support. Traditionally, this has responded well to a 'reefing' procedure known as an open inferior capsular shift. More recently, the procedure has been carried out as an arthroscopic procedure, rather than open surgery, again with comparable results. Most recently, the procedure has been carried out using radio frequency technology to shrink the redundant shoulder capsule (thermal capsular shrinkage); while long-term results of this development are currently unproven, recent studies show thermal capsular shrinkage have higher failure rates with the highest number of cases of instability recurrence and re-operation.

=== Physical Therapy ===
Physical therapy is key to preventing recurrent dislocation of the affected shoulder. The main goals of physical therapy are restoring range of motion, strength, and function, while minimizing pain and discomfort. The specific exercises, sets, repetitions, and duration vary depending on the patient's specific situation and provider's preference, but generally entail some form of first stretching the affected shoulder, followed by use of resistance bands and/or light weights, and finally use of weight lifting to improve strength. Physical therapy also aims to increase strength of surrounding shoulder muscles, which helps stabilize the shoulder and decrease the likelihood of recurrent dislocations.

Following shoulder reduction, most people are given self-management advice on recovery, such as home exercises, but some receive additional physiotherapy. A randomized controlled trial showed similar shoulder function after 6 months between those who received self-management advice only and those who had extra physiotherapy. Both groups also had a similar number of complications.

== Prognosis ==
After an anterior shoulder dislocation, the risk of a future dislocation is about 20%. This risk is greater in males than females.

== See also ==
- Shoulder problems
