= Perthes lesion =

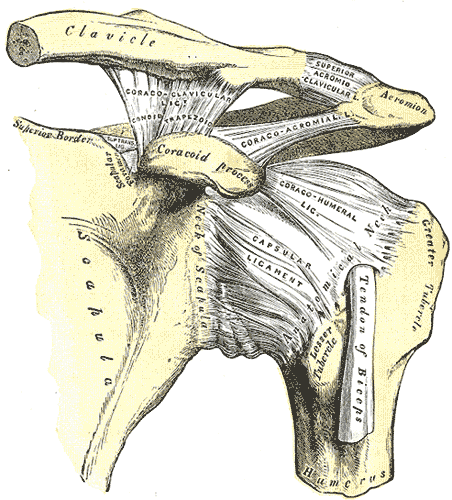
- Glenohumeral

Perthes lesion is a variant of Bankart lesion, presenting as an anterior glenohumeral injury that occurs when the scapular periosteum remains intact but is stripped medially and the anterior labrum is avulsed from the glenoid but remains partially attached to the scapula by intact periosteum.

== Diagnosis ==
The lesion is associated with any damage to the antero-inferior labrum. Most commonly due to anterior shoulder dislocation. The lesion often occurs after the initial dislocation. In chronic cases, there may be fibrosis and resynovialization of the labrum and periosteum.

The lesion is best identified on MR arthrography. Additional views in ABER (ABduction and External Rotation) of the shoulder aid in this diagnosis.

Differential diagnoses include:

- Bankart lesion
- Alpsa lesion
- GLAD
- HAGL
- BHAGL

== Treatment ==
Treatment is surgical re-attachment of the labrum preferably via arthroscopy.

== Eponym ==
It is named after Georg C. Perthes (1869-1927), a German Surgeon and X-Ray diagnostic pioneer who first described the lesion in 1905.
