= Humeral avulsion of the glenohumeral ligament =

Medical condition

Humeral avulsion of the glenohumeral ligament (HAGL) is defined as an avulsion (tearing away) of the inferior glenohumeral ligament from the anatomic neck of the humerus. In other words, it occurs when we have disruption of the ligaments that join the humerus to the glenoid. HAGL tends to occur in 7.5-9.3% of cases of anterior shoulder instability. Making it an uncommon cause of anterior shoulder instability. Avulsion of this ligamentous complex may occur in three sites: glenoid insertion (40%), the midsubstance (35%) and the humeral insertion (25%). Bony humeral avulsion of the glenohumeral ligament (BHAGL) refers when we have HAGL with bony fracture.

== Signs and symptoms ==
Signs and symptoms of a dislocation or rotator cuff tear such as:

- Significant pain, which can sometimes be felt past the shoulder, along the arm.
- Inability to move the arm from its current position, particularly in positions with the arm reaching away from the body and with the top of the arm twisted toward the back.
- Numbness of the arm.
- Visibly displaced shoulder. Some dislocations result in the shoulder appearing unusually square.
- No bone in the side of the shoulder showing shoulder has become dislocated.

== Causes ==
Most commonly due to anterior shoulder dislocation caused by hyperabduction and external rotation of the arm. Usually in young men who play contact sports (E.g. rugby, football, volleyball, basketball, etc.). Frequent anterior (frontward) subluxation also poses a great risk factor.

== Diagnosis ==
The inferior glenohumeral ligament attaches to the glenoid labrum(cartilage which surrounds the "shoulder socket") at one end, and at the other end attaches to the anatomic neck of the humerus(the section of the humerus which is directly below the head of the humerus which rotates within the "shoulder socket"). In between these two attachment points the ligament droops down to give the appearance of a U, wherein(on the right side of the body), the left end of the U is its attachment to the humerus, and the right end is its attachment to the glenoid labrum.

Excessive stress on the inferior glenohumeral ligament, often due to physical trauma, can cause the end attached to the humerus to detach and fall down, transforming the U-shaped appearance of the ligament into a J-shaped appearance called the "J" Sign. On the left side of the body—where it is the right side of the ligament which is attached to humerus— the U becomes a reverse "J" Sign. Imaging (MRI) is the best modality for diagnosis where the presence of the "J" sign on an MRI indicates that this detachment has occurred.

Clinical differential diagnosis of anterior shoulder instability include:

- Bankart lesions
- Anterior labroligamentous periosteal sleeve avulsions
- glenolabral articular disruption (GLAD) lesions
- HAGL

== Treatment ==
Treatment is surgical reconstruction via arthroscopy.
