= Glenolabral articular disruption =

Shoulder injury

- Other names: GLAD
- Specialty: Physical medicine and rehabilitation

Glenolabral articular disruption (GLAD) lesion is a type of shoulder injury. It is difficult to diagnose clinically, and requires surgical repair to correct the damage to the shoulder.

== Signs and symptoms ==
Persistent or worsening shoulder pain is the most common symptom of glenolabral articular disruption lesions. The pain is often described as anterior or global. Joint instability has also been reported in some cases.

== Causes ==
Glenolabral articular disruption lesions often develop as a result of shoulder trauma. External rotation and forced shoulder adduction from an abduction position characterize the classic pattern from the original series. This often occurs due to falling onto an outstretched arm. The injury has also been reported in association with forceful adduction as a result of throwing.

== Mechanism ==
The glenoid cartilage underneath the labrum in the glenohumeral (GH) joint is disrupted by glenolabral articular disruption. The articulation of the humeral head inside the glenoid fossa of the scapula forms the GH joint itself, which is a synovial ball and socket joint. The labrum, a fibrocartilaginous rim, encircles the fossa at its edge and is lined with articular cartilage. The labrum gives the fossa more depth and serves as an anchor for the GH ligaments and the long head of the biceps tendon.

Glenolabral articular disruption lesions usually occur from forceful adduction of the humeral head onto the glenoid fossa. Shear force might also be present. This results in varying degrees of underlying cartilage damage as well as a superficial tear along the anterior-inferior aspect of the labrum. This could be a loose chondral body, a more significant flap tear, or even a focal cartilage defect.

== Diagnosis ==
On non-contrast MRI or CT arthrography imaging, lesions might be harder to find, but the more recent 3T MRI scanners might increase the pick-up rate in the absence of contrast. The accepted gold standard for identifying or detecting the glenolabral articular disruption lesion is MR arthroscopy (MRA).

== Treatment ==
The preferred course of treatment for the glenolabral articular disruption lesion is arthroscopic debridement of the labrum and glenoid articular defect in patients without any discernible anterior instability.

== See also ==
- ALPSA lesion
- Bankart lesion
