= Hill–Sachs lesion =

Cortical depression in the posterolateral head of the humerus

- Other names: Hill–Sachs fracture
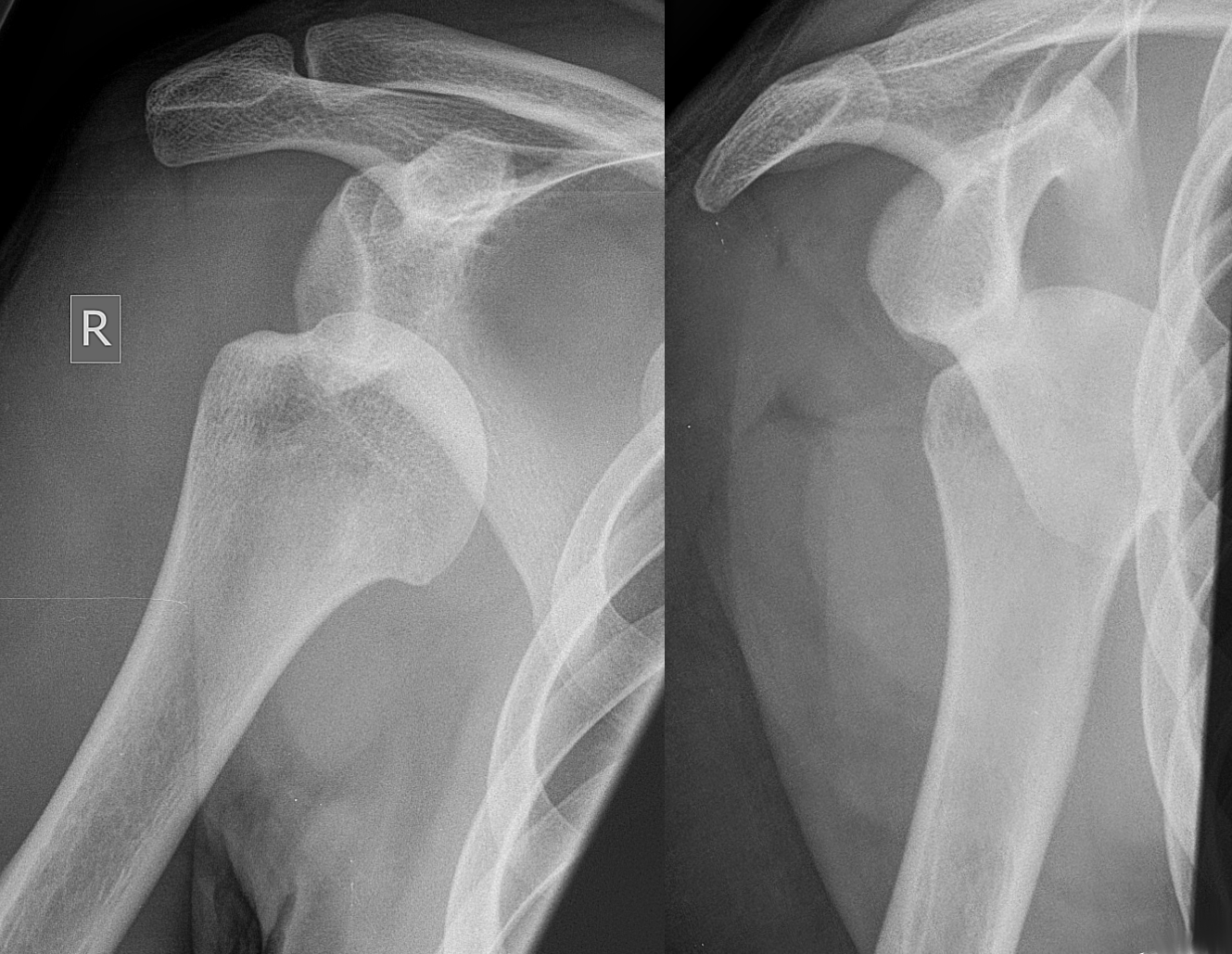
- Anterior shoulder dislocation on X-ray with a large Hill–Sachs lesion
- Specialty: Orthopedics

A Hill–Sachs lesion, or Hill–Sachs fracture, is a cortical depression in the posterolateral head of the humerus. It results from forceful impaction of the humeral head against the anteroinferior glenoid rim when the shoulder is dislocated anteriorly.

== Signs and symptoms ==
- Pain while rotating joint bones
- Sounds of rotating bone joints
- Recurrent dislocation of shoulder
- Apprehension sign

== Causes ==
The lesion is associated with anterior shoulder dislocation. When the humerus is driven from the glenoid cavity, its relatively soft head impacts against the anterior edge of the glenoid. The result is a divot or flattening in the posterolateral aspect of the humeral head, usually opposite the coracoid process. The mechanism which leads to shoulder dislocation is usually traumatic but can vary, especially if there is history of previous dislocations. Sports, falls, seizures, assaults, throwing, reaching, pulling on the arm, or turning over in bed can all be causes of anterior dislocation.

== Diagnosis ==
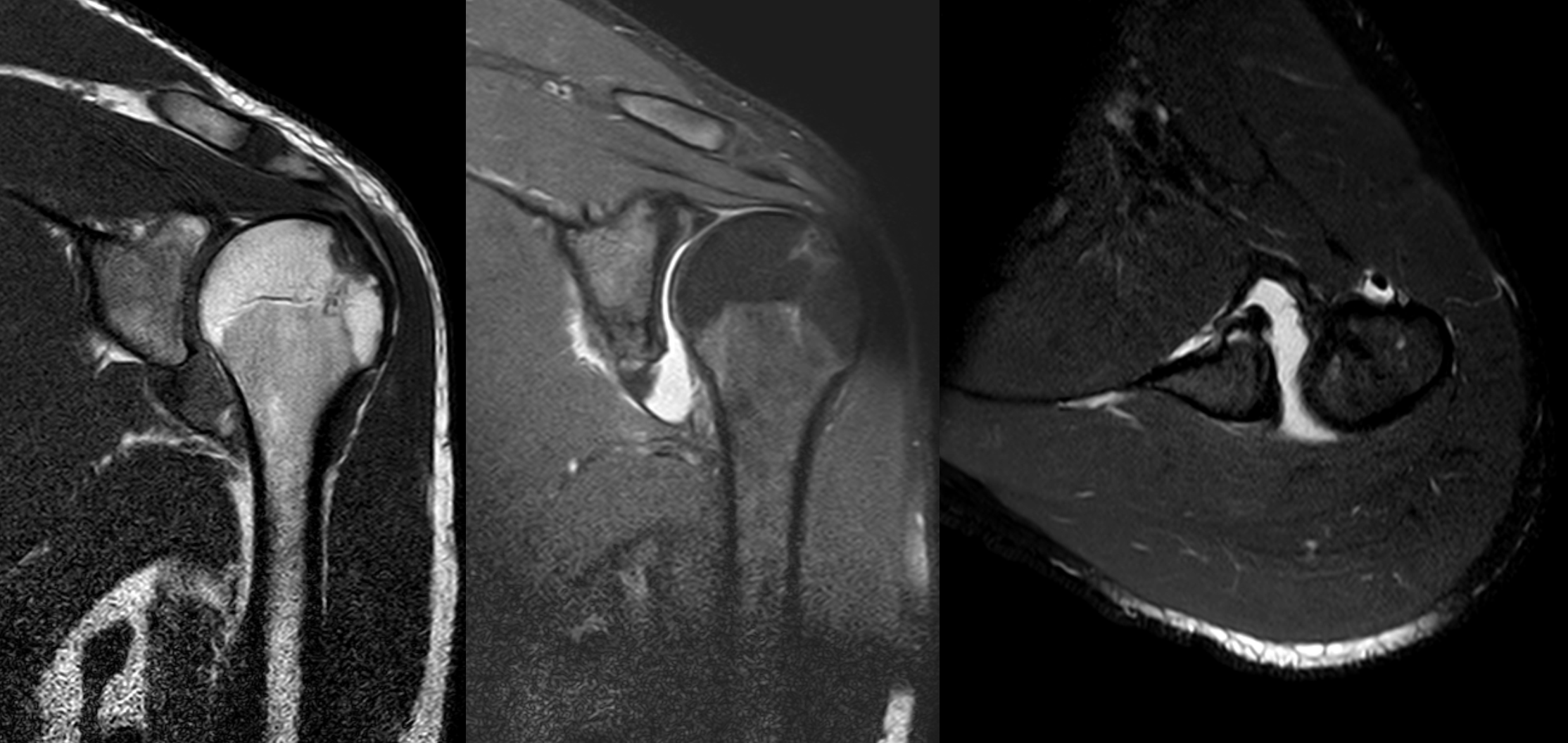
MRI of shoulder after dislocation with Hill–Sachs lesion and labral Bankart's lesion

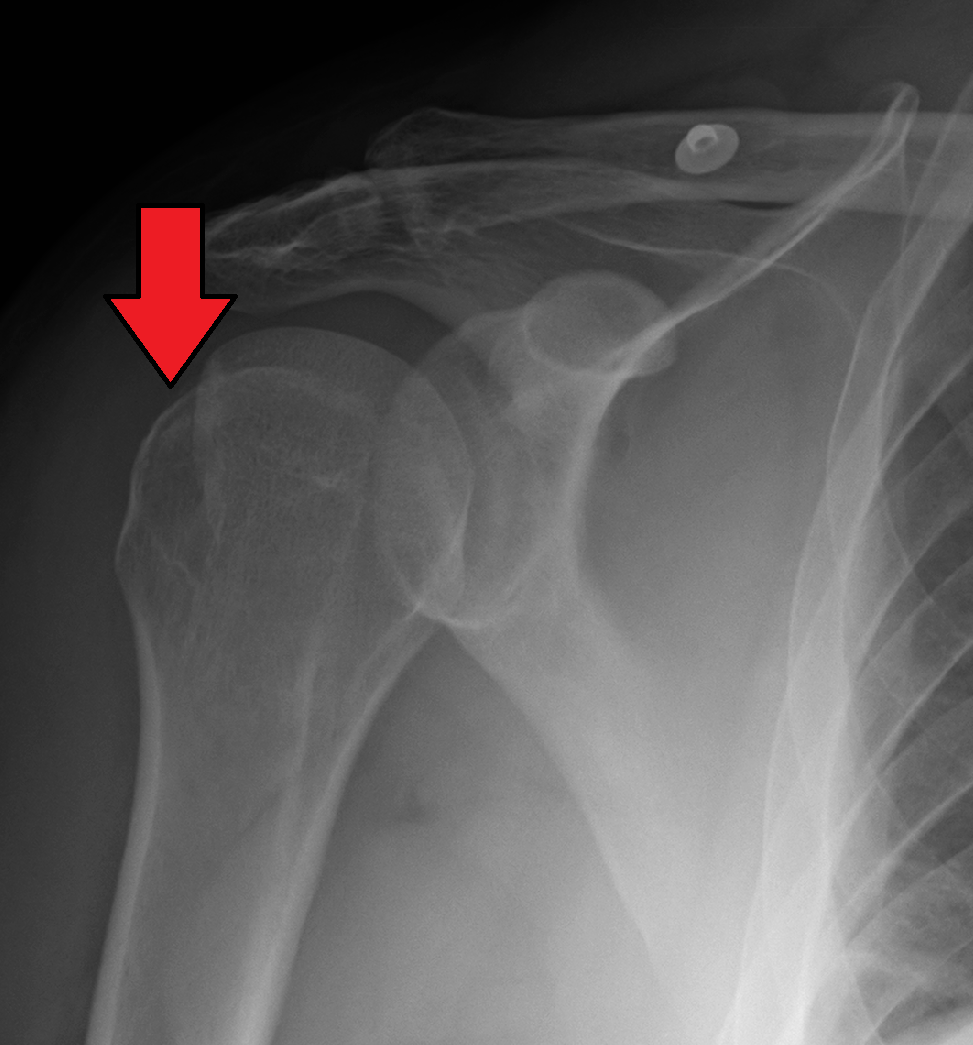
Hill–Sachs lesion post-shoulder dislocation

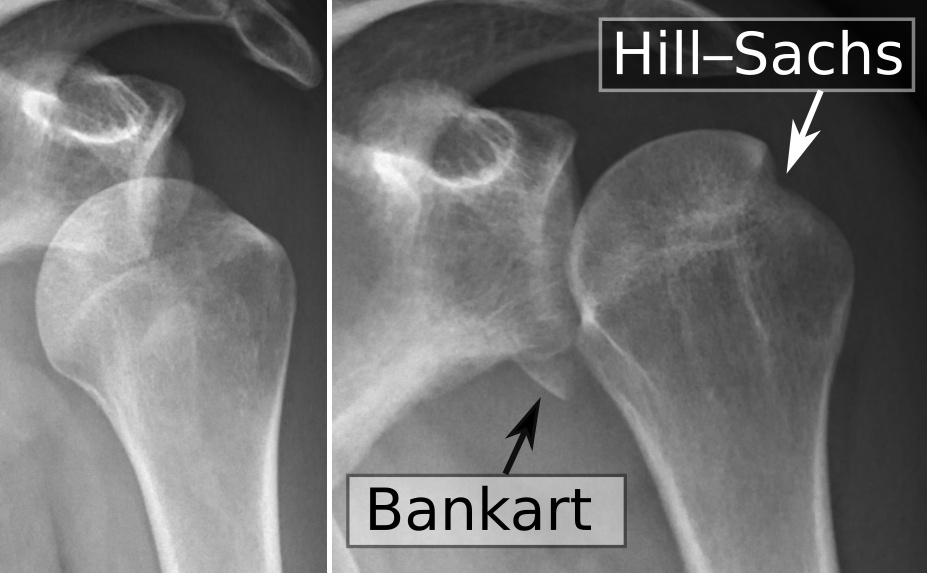
X-ray at left shows anterior dislocation in a young man after trying to get up from his bed. X-ray at right shows same shoulder after reduction and internal rotation, revealing both a Bankart lesion and a Hill-Sachs lesion.

Diagnosis can be suspected by history and physical examination which is usually followed by imaging. Because of the mechanism of injury, apprehension of anterior dislocation is common with provocative maneuvers. Hill–Sachs lesions have been classified as "engaging" or "non-engaging", with engaging lesions defined by the ability of the glenoid to sublux into the humeral head defect during abduction and external rotation. Engaging dislocations have a higher risk of recurrent anterior dislocation, and their presence can help guide surgical management. Imaging diagnosis conventionally begins with plain film radiography. Generally, anteroposterior (AP) radiographs of the shoulder with the arm in internal rotation offer the best yield while axillary views and AP radiographs with external rotation tend to obscure the defect. However, pain and tenderness in the injured joint make appropriate positioning difficult and in a recent study of plain film x-ray for Hill–Sachs lesions, the sensitivity was only about 20%. i.e. the finding was not visible on plain film x-ray about 80% of the time.

By contrast, studies have shown the value of ultrasonography in diagnosing Hill–Sachs lesions. In a population with recurrent dislocation using findings at surgery as the gold standard, a sensitivity of 96% was demonstrated. In a second study of patients with continuing shoulder instability after trauma, and using double contrast CT as a gold standard, a sensitivity of over 95% was demonstrated for ultrasound. It should be borne in mind that in both those studies, patients were having continuing problems after initial injury, and therefore the presence of a Hill–Sachs lesion was more likely. Nevertheless, ultrasonography, which is noninvasive and free from radiation, offers important advantages.

MRI has also been shown to be highly reliable for the diagnosis of Hill-Sachs (and Bankart) lesions. One study used challenging methodology. First of all, it applied to those patients with a single, or first time, dislocation. Such lesions were likely to be smaller and therefore more difficult to detect. Second, two radiologists, who were blinded to the surgical outcome, reviewed the MRI findings, while two orthopedic surgeons, who were blinded to the MRI findings, reviewed videotapes of the arthroscopic procedures. Coefficiency of agreement was then calculated for the MRI and arthroscopic findings and there was total agreement (kappa = 1.0) for Hill-Sachs and Bankart lesions.

== Treatment ==
The decision to repair of the Hill–Sachs lesion is based on its association with continuing symptoms and instability. This is particularly important in patients below 25 year of age and in throwing athletes. The role of the Hill-Sachs in continuing symptoms, in turn, may be related to its width and depth, particularly if involving greater than 20% of the articular surface. Associated bony lesions or fractures may coexist in the glenoid such as the bony Bankart lesion. In such scenarios, surgical repair may include bony augmentation, a common example of which is the Latarjet procedure. Additional lesions such as a Bankart, SLAP tear, or biceps injury may also be present.

== Incidence ==
The incidence of Hill–Sachs lesion is not known with certainty. It has been reported to be present in 40% to 90% of patients presenting with anterior shoulder instability, that is subluxation or dislocation. In those who have recurrent events, it may be as high as 100%. Its presence is a specific sign of dislocation and can thus be used as an indicator that dislocation has occurred even if the joint has regained its normal alignment. Large, engaging Hill-Sachs fractures can contribute to shoulder instability and will often cause painful clicking, catching, or popping. The average depth of Hill–Sachs lesion has been reported as 4.1 mm.

== Eponym ==
The lesion is named after Harold Arthur Hill (1901–1973) and Maurice David Sachs (1909–1987), two radiologists from San Francisco, USA. In 1940, they published a report of 119 cases of shoulder dislocation and showed that the defect resulted from direct compression of the humeral head. Before their paper, although the fracture was already known to be a sign of shoulder dislocation, the precise mechanism was uncertain.

== See also ==
- Bankart lesion
- Terms for anatomical location
