= Bankart lesion =

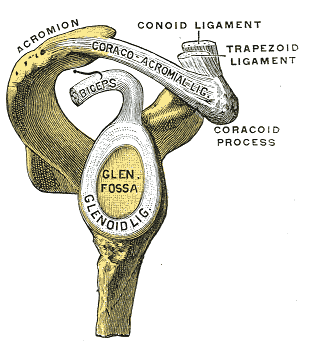
- The glenoid labrum, labeled glenoid ligament, is damaged in a Bankart lesion. Lateral view demonstrating the articular surface of the right scapula is shown.
- Symptoms: Shoulder instability and widespread shoulder discomfort, and catching, locking, or popping feelings in shoulders.
- Risk factors: Anterior shoulder dislocation and/or repeated anterior shoulder subluxations.
- Diagnostic method: X-ray and MRI.
- Differential diagnosis: Anterior labroligamentous periosteal sleeve avulsion, Rotator Cuff Tears, SLAP Lesion, Impingement, Perthes lesion, Glenolabral articular disruption, Humeral avulsion of the glenohumeral ligament.

A Bankart lesion is a type of shoulder injury that occurs following a dislocated shoulder. It is an injury of the anterior (inferior) glenoid labrum of the shoulder. When this happens, a pocket at the front of the glenoid forms that allows the humeral head to dislocate into it. It is an indication for surgery and often accompanied by a Hill–Sachs lesion, damage to the posterior humeral head.

A bony Bankart is a Bankart lesion that includes a fracture of the anterior-inferior glenoid cavity of the scapula.

The Bankart lesion is named after English orthopedic surgeon Arthur Sydney Blundell Bankart (1879–1951).

== Signs and symptoms ==
Bankart lesions are characterized by recurrent shoulder instability and widespread shoulder discomfort. Some individuals may experience catching, locking, or popping feelings in their shoulders. The majority of Bankart lesion patients have primary or recurrent anterior shoulder dislocation.

== Diagnosis ==
The diagnosis is usually initially made by a combination of physical exam and medical imaging, where the latter may be projectional radiography (in cases of bony Bankart) and/or MRI of the shoulder. The presence of intra-articular contrast allows for better evaluation of the glenoid labrum. Type V SLAP tears extend into the Bankart defect.

== Treatment ==
Arthroscopic repair of Bankart injuries have good success rates. However, a study has found that nearly one-third of young adult patients require further surgery for continued instability after the initial procedure, with higher re-operation rates in those less than 20 years of age. Options for repair include an arthroscopic technique or a more invasive open Latarjet procedure, with the open technique tending to have a lower incidence of recurrent dislocation, but also a reduced range of motion following surgery.

== Gallery ==
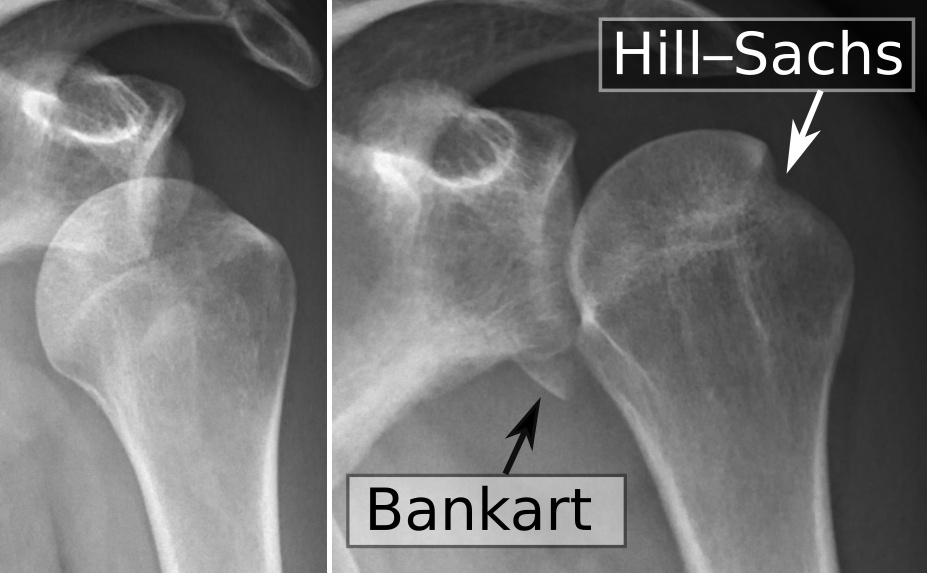
X-ray at left shows anterior dislocation in a young man after trying to get up from his bed. X-ray at right shows same shoulder after reduction and internal rotation, revealing both a bony Bankart lesion and a Hill-Sachs lesion.

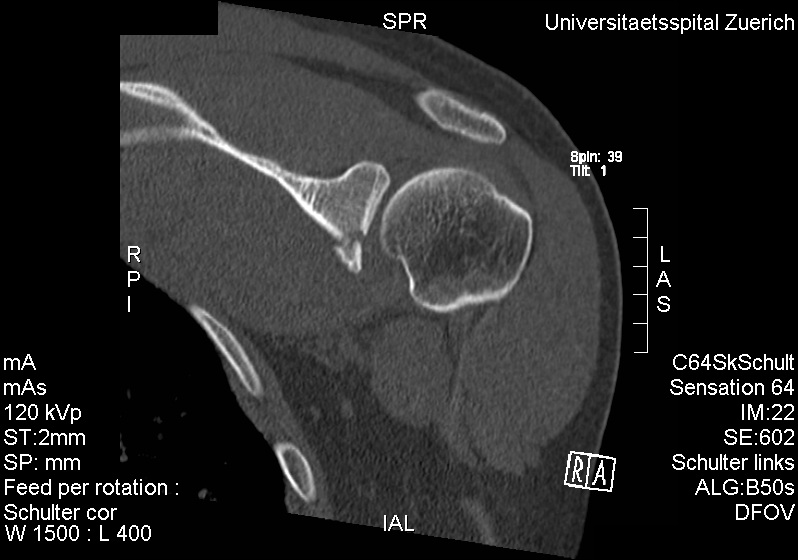
CT scan showing a bony Bankart lesion at the antero-inferior glenoid

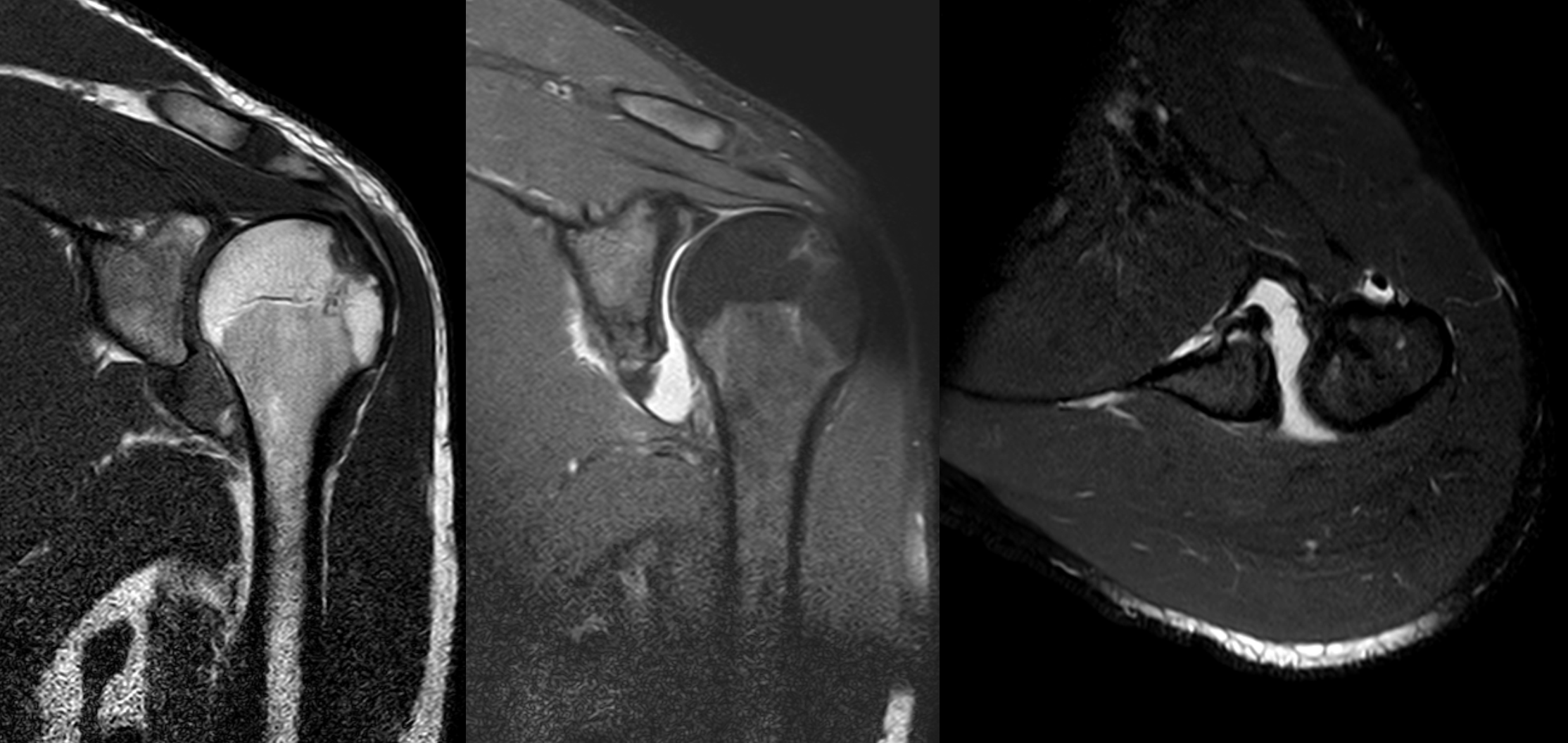
MRI of the shoulder after an anterior dislocation showing a Hill-Sachs lesion and labral Bankart lesion
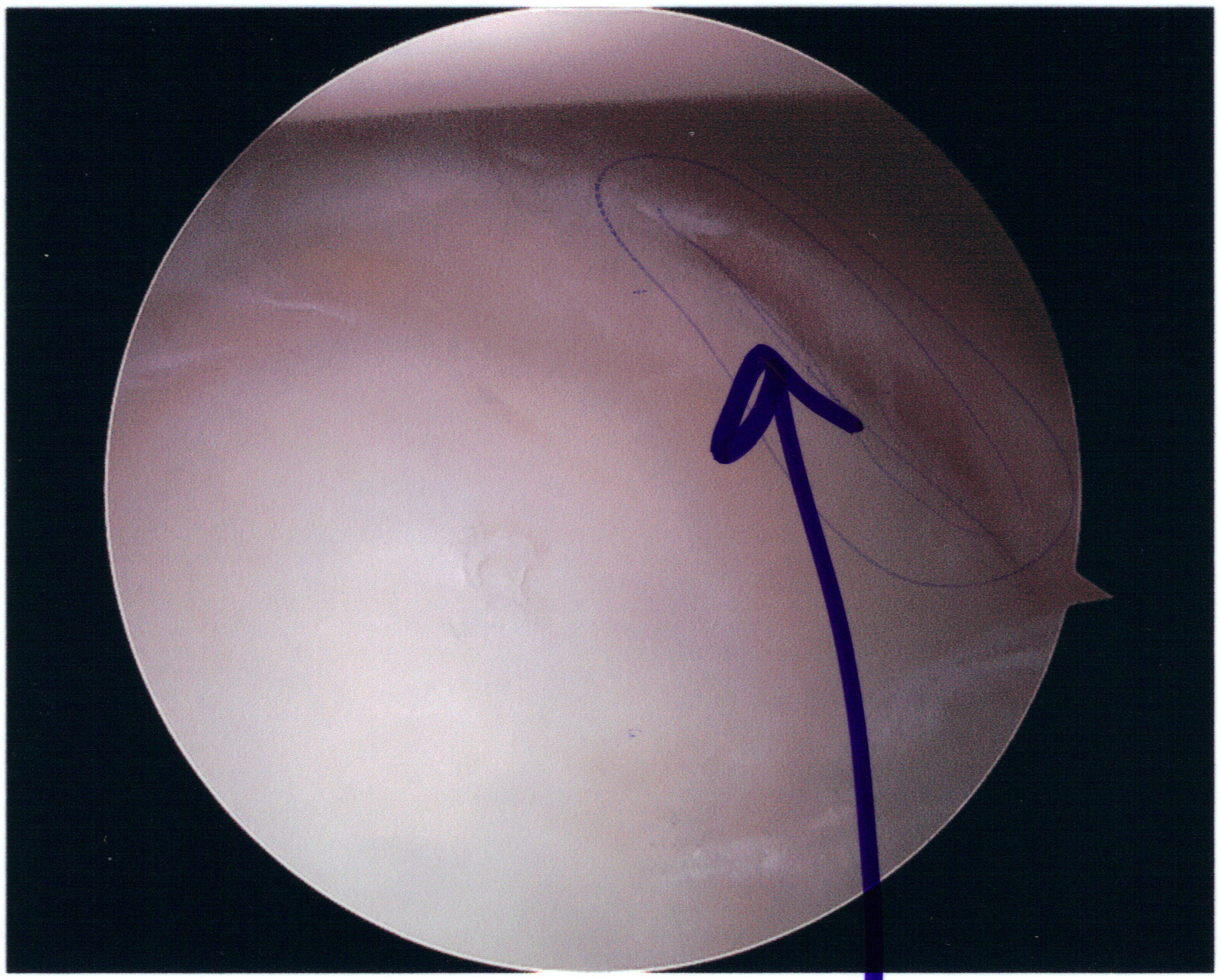
Bankart lesion seen at arthroscopy

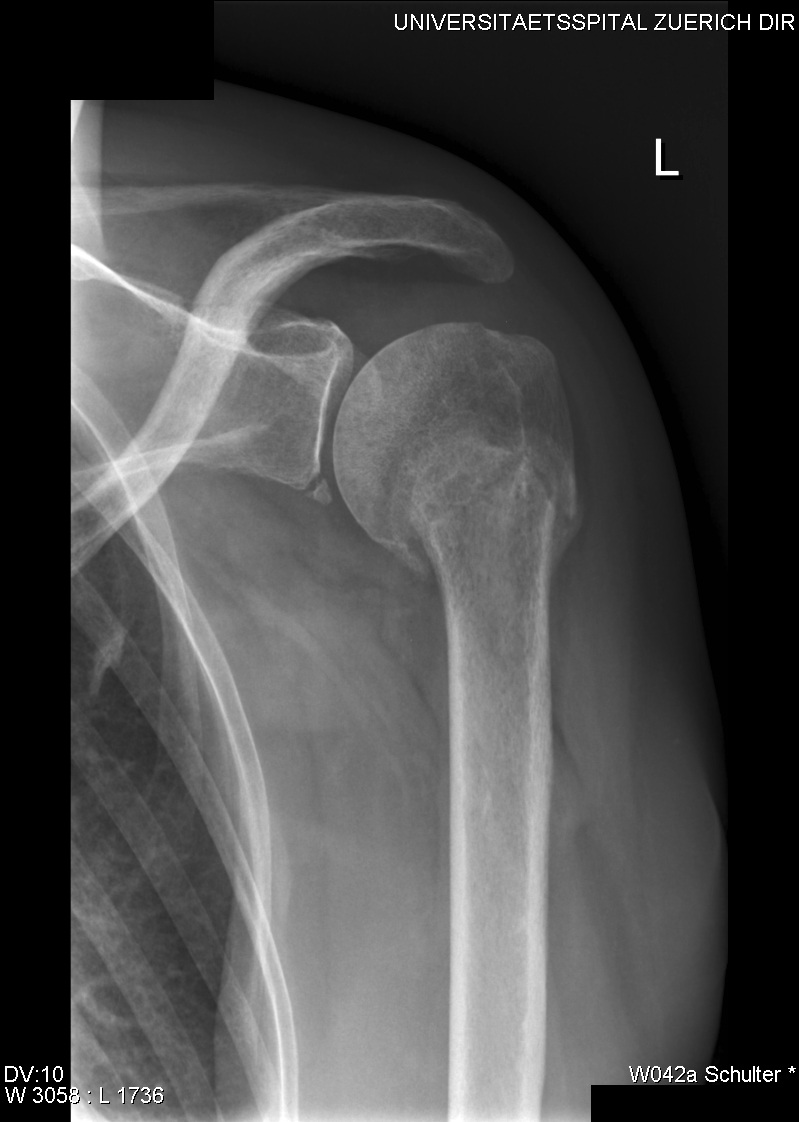
Radiograph showing a bony Bankart lesion with stationary fragment at the inferior glenoid

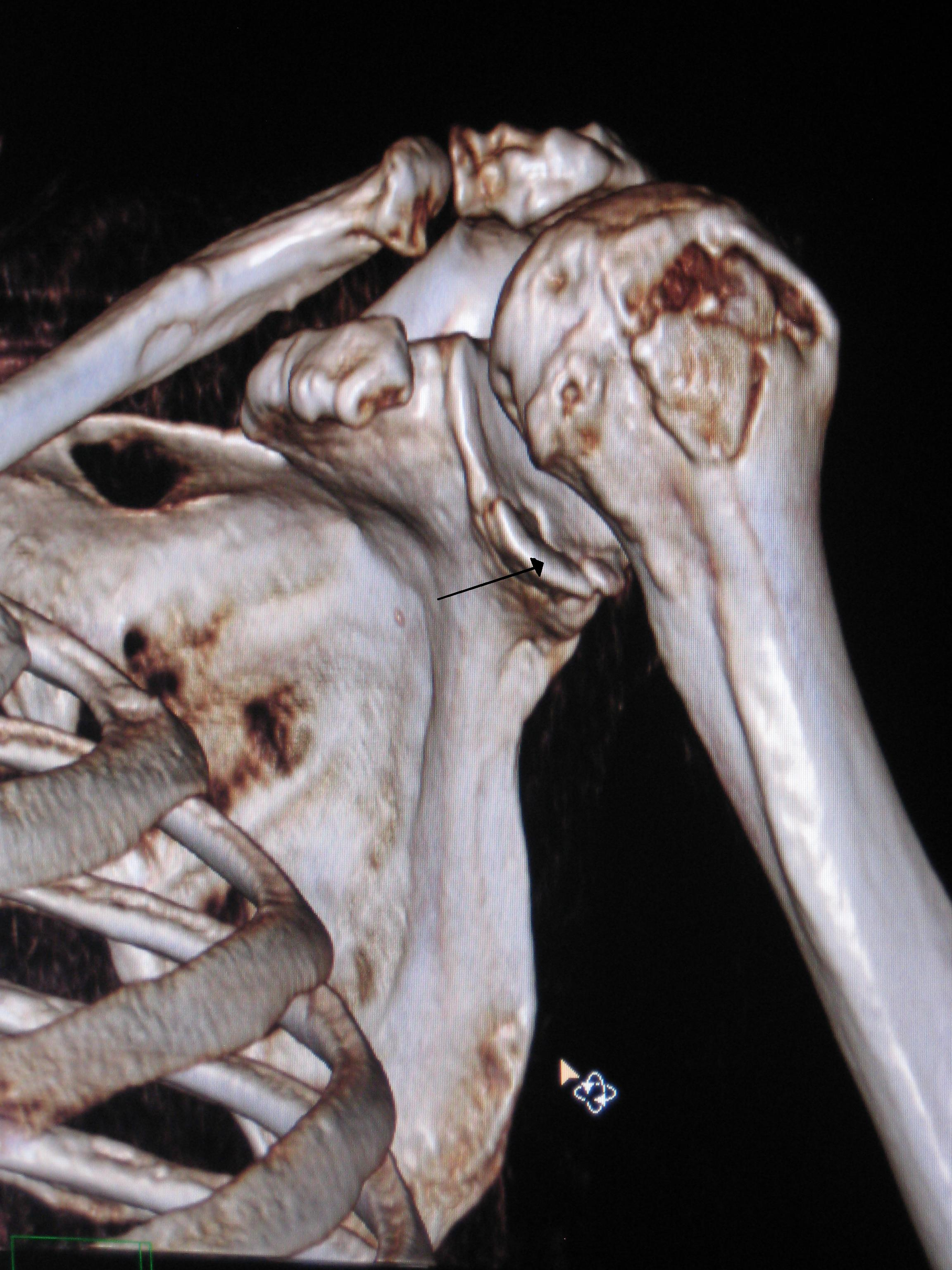
3-D CT reconstruction of a bankart lesion which occurred post anterior shoulder dislocation. This subject's humerus remains mildly superiorly subluxated. Fracture marked by a black arrow.

== See also ==
- Terms for anatomical location
