= Keratosis =

Growth of keratin on the skin or mucous membranes

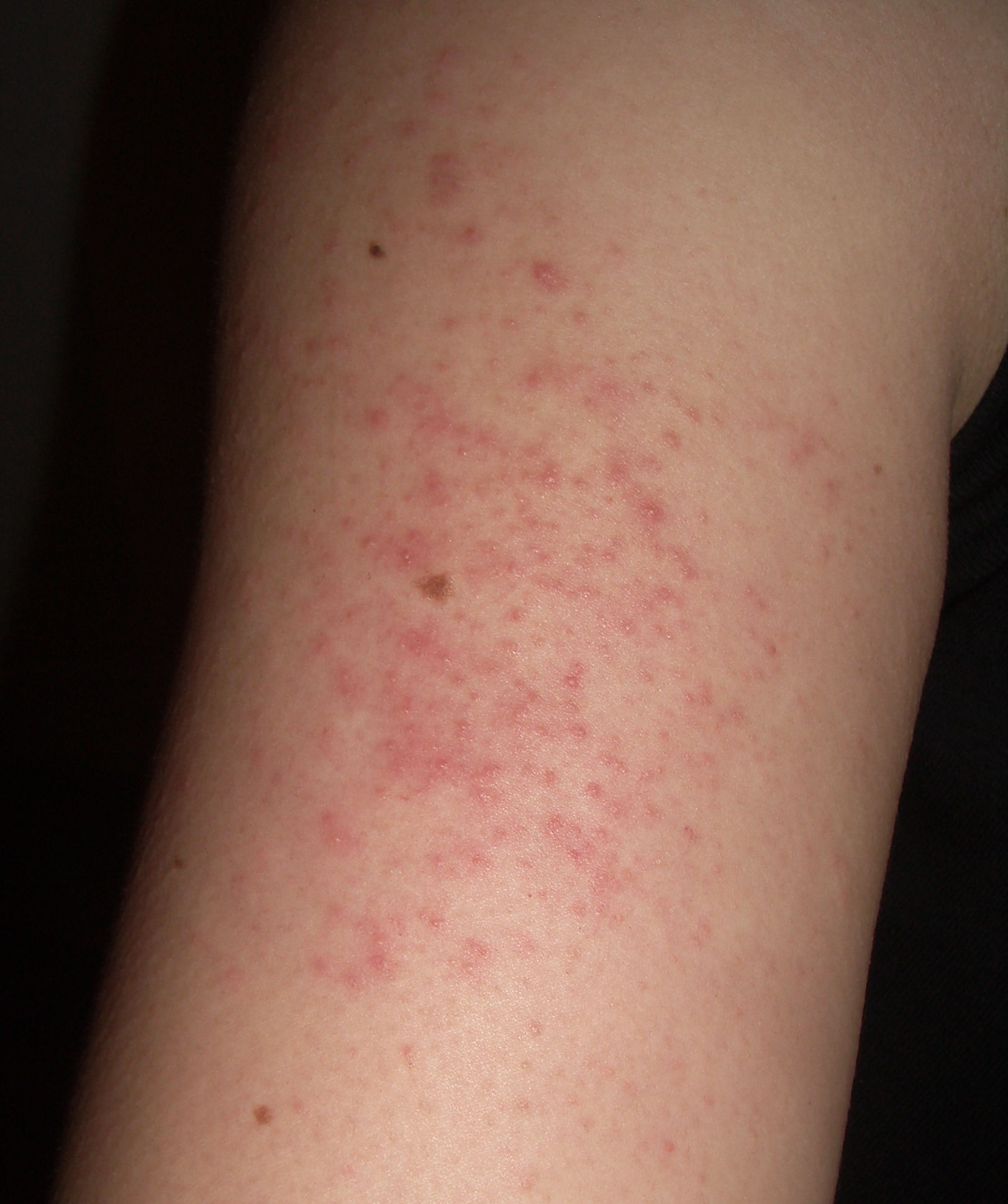
- Upper arm showing keratosis pilaris
- Specialty: Dermatology, medical genetics

Keratosis (from kerat- + -osis) is a growth of keratin on the skin or on mucous membranes stemming from keratinocytes, the prominent cell type in the epidermis. Most are not serious but actinic keratosis (also known as solar keratosis) and chronic scar keratosis, are precancerous conditions.

More specifically, it can refer to:

- actinic keratosis (also known as solar keratosis), a premalignant condition
- chronic scar keratosis
- hydrocarbon keratosis
- keratosis pilaris (KP, also known as follicular keratosis)
- seborrheic keratosis, not premalignant

== See also ==
- Folliculitis
- Keratoderma
