= HAGL =

HAGL may refer to:

- Height above ground level
- Hoang Anh Gia Lai Group, a Vietnamese company
- Hoàng Anh Gia Lai F.C., an association football club
- Humeral avulsion of the glenohumeral ligament, a medical condition
