= Hydrocarbon keratosis =

Skin lesion caused by exposure to certain hydrocarbon chemicals

- Other names: Pitch keratosis, tar keratosis, and tar wart.
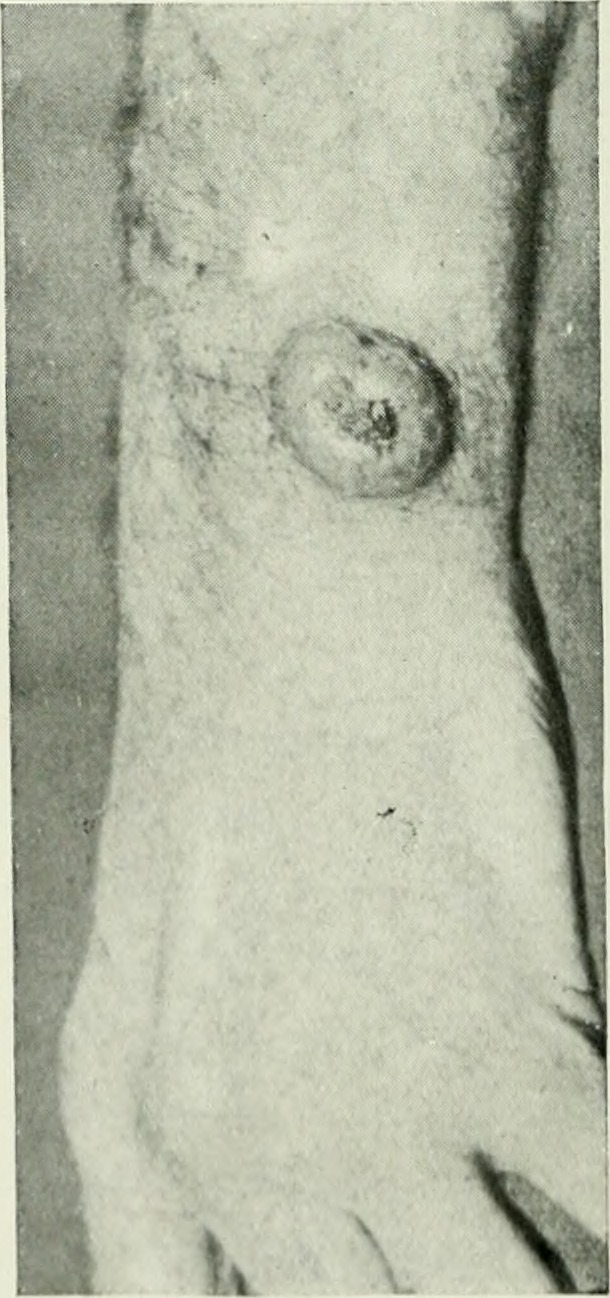
- Tar wart
- Specialty: Dermatology

A hydrocarbon keratosis, also known as pitch keratosis, tar keratosis, and tar wart, is a precancerous keratotic skin lesion that occurs in people who have been occupationally exposed to polycyclic aromatic hydrocarbons.
