= Glenopolar angle =

The glenopolar angle (GPA) is a radiographical measurement used to assess the rotational alignment of the glenoid relative to the scapula body. It reflects malalignment of the glenoid about an anteroposterior (front-to-back) axis perpendicular to the scapular plane.

The glenopolar angle is defined as the angle form between:

- a line connecting the most cranial (superior) and most caudal (inferior) points of the glenoid cavity and
- a line connecting the most cranial of the glenoid cavity with the most caudal point of the scapular body.

A glenopolar angle ranging from 30° to 45° is generally considered normal. Deviation from this range may indicate scapular deformity or malalignment.

The glenopolar angle is primarily used in orthopedic and scapular surgery, particularly in the evaluation and management of scapular neck fractures, where altered alignment may affect clinical outcomes.
