= Cameron lesions =

- Other names: Cameron ulcer
- Specialty: Gastroenterology

A Cameron lesion is a linear erosion or ulceration of the mucosal folds lining the stomach where it is constricted by the thoracic diaphragm in persons with large hiatal hernias. The lesions may cause chronic blood loss resulting in iron deficiency anemia; less often they cause acute bleeding.

Treatment of anemia with Cameron lesions includes iron supplements and acid suppression by a proton-pump inhibitor (PPI). Surgical hernia repair is sometimes needed.

== Signs and symptoms ==
Cameron lesions may lead to bleeding, and may be associated with heartburn or other symptoms of reflux. Generally, Cameron lesions do not cause pain.

== Cause ==
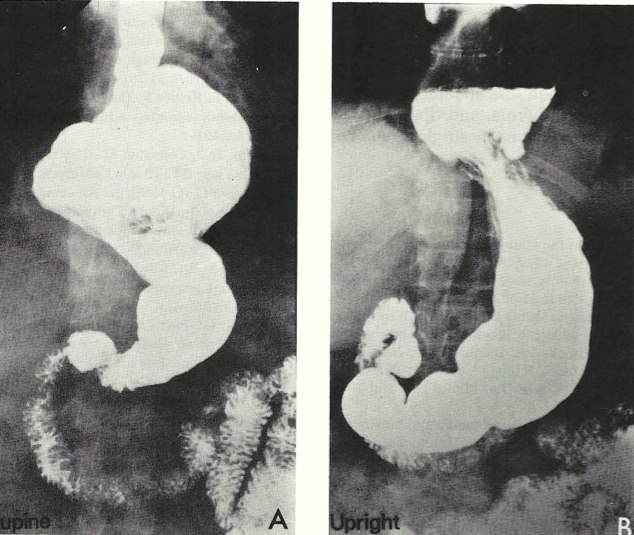
A large hiatal hernia. Two x-rays from the same examination. On lying down (A) more stomach slides above the diaphragm than when upright (B) Note constriction of stomach at diaphragm level.

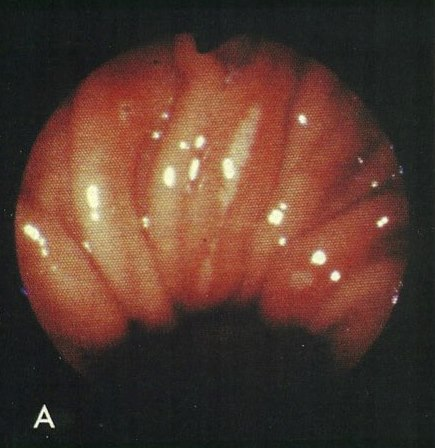
Cameron lesions. A long linear erosion and smaller non-linear erosions on the crests of inflamed gastric folds at the level of the diaphragm.

The diaphragm separates the chest from the abdomen. The esophagus (swallowing tube) passes through the hiatal opening in the diaphragm to reach the stomach. With a hiatal hernia, part of the stomach is displaced upwards into the chest (Figure 1). Large hiatal hernias may cause chronic gastrointestinal blood loss leading to iron deficiency anemia. One study in people with hernias showed mean blood loss of 15ml (a tablespoonful) per day in those with anemia, compared to 3 ml per day in those without anemia. In one report 10% of 100 people investigated for iron deficiency anemia had a large hiatal hernia. A 1967 review found that 20% of 1305 individuals having surgery for hiatal hernia were anemic. Cameron in 1976 compared 259 people with large hiatal hernias visible on chest x-ray with 259 controls without hernias. Present or past anemia, usually with proven iron deficiency, was found in 10.4% of those with hernias, significantly more than 0.4% of controls, p<0.001. Surgical hernia repair usually prevents anemia recurrence; in 2 large series, post-operative follow-up showed anemia had resolved in 71-92% of subjects. An isotope study showed correction of blood loss after hernia repair. These findings showed that the hernia was the usual cause of the anemia.

=== Cameron lesions cause blood loss from hiatal hernias ===
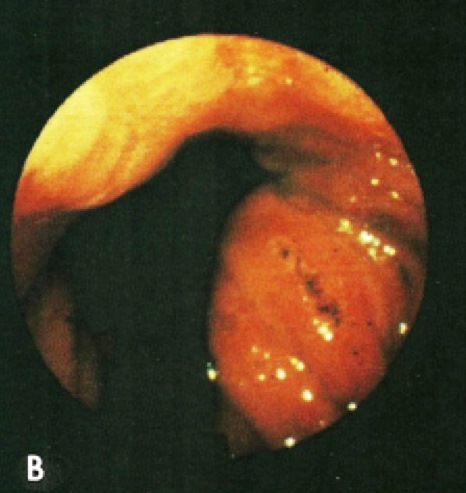
Red, congested folds with blood on a Cameron lesion.

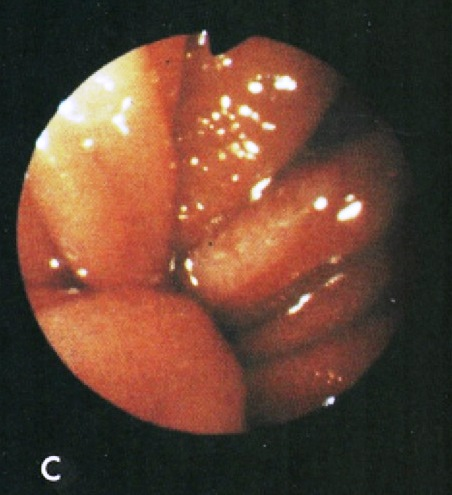
After aspirating some air through the endoscope, this lesion was seen rubbing against opposite folds at the diaphragm level on respiration.

Based on their surgical observations, Windsor and Collis in 1967 proposed that blood loss was due to local trauma to the stomach where it rides to and fro in the hiatus on respiration. Boutelier et al. noted on gastroscopy ulcers and erosions at the level of the neck of the hernia in individuals with acute and chronic bleeding, but no detailed description was given. Cameron and Higgins in 1986 described linear gastric erosions, later called "Cameron lesions", in people with x-rays showing one-third or more of the stomach above the diaphragm. (figure 1). Over 6 years, Cameron and Higgins studied 109 persons with large hiatal hernias, 55 with anemia and 54 without anemia, at esophagogastroduodenoscopy. Cameron lesions, often multiple, were found at or near the level where the herniated stomach was constricted by the diaphragm. The lesions were typically white, superficial, linear, and oriented along the crests of inflamed appearing mucosal folds (figure 2). Small amounts of blood were often seen on the lesions (Fig 3). Mucosal folds at the diaphragm level were often seen rubbing against each other on respiration (Fig 4). It was proposed that the lesions were caused by mechanical trauma at the level of constriction by the diaphragm Cameron lesions were found in 42% of persons with anemia compared to 24% in those without anemia, a statistically significant difference, p<0.05. Spots of fresh or clotted blood were seen on the lesions in 25% of persons with anemia compared to 7% without anemia, also a significant difference, p<0.05. In the 109 persons in this study, 15 had reflux esophagitis, 11 had peptic ulcers, and 7 had Barrett's esophagus, but none of these findings correlated with anemia. Thus, in people with large hernias, Cameron lesions with evidence of slow bleeding were associated with iron deficiency anemia.

Acute bleeding from Cameron lesions, vomiting blood, or passing black bowel movements, is rare; in one report Cameron lesions were found in 3.8% of people presenting with anemia, but in only 0.2% of those with acute bleeding. Small hernias with 2–5 cm of stomach above the diaphragm are commoner than large hernias but Cameron lesions are usually found with large hernias.

Anemia in patients with large hernias was corrected by surgical repair in the majority of instances, but Cameron lesions were found in only about half of these individuals. One explanation is that endoscopists unfamiliar with their appearance can miss the lesions However, in the original description of Cameron lesions they were found in less than half the patients despite careful search, and no other causes of gastrointestinal bleeding. were seen. It is probable that these superficial lesions can heal and recur, with the bleeding stopping temporarily

== Diagnosis ==
Cameron lesions are usually found in older adults with anemia symptoms such as fatigue, shortness of breath, and appearing pale. Blood tests in iron deficiency show low hemoglobin, microcytic hypochromic red cells, and low iron-binding saturation and ferritin levels. The lesions are visualized by esophagogastroduodenoscopy. Sometimes the lesions are found when endoscopy is done for other hernia symptoms than anemia such as heartburn, regurgitation, swallowing difficulty, pain or distention. When a person with iron deficiency anemia is found to have a large hernia and Cameron lesions on endoscopy, this usually explains the blood loss. A lower gastrointestinal bleeding site such as colon cancer may be excluded by colonscopy. and other tests as clinically indicated.

== Treatment ==
Anemia associated with Cameron lesions usually responds to oral iron medication, which may be needed for years. Gastric acid suppression may promote lesion healing and a proton-pump inhibitor such as omeprazole is often prescribed. Surgical hernia repair is sometimes needed for indications such as refractory anemia requiring repeated blood transfusions, or anemia combined with other hernia symptoms.
