= Degloving =

Injury

Finger degloving and amputation

Degloving occurs when skin and the fat below it, the subcutaneous tissue, are torn away from the underlying anatomical structures they are normally attached to. It is a type of avulsion. Normally the subcutaneous tissue layer is attached to the fibrous layer that covers muscles known as deep fascia.

A degloving injury, a type of soft-tissue injury which can occur anywhere in the body, commonly affects areas including the face, scalp, trunk, limbs, and genitalia. Degloving injuries are caused by shearing forces that cause the soft tissue layers to get pulled apart. They were first reported in the twentieth century from machinery such as wringers used to dry clothes. The invention and widespread use of automobiles also lead to degloving and other traumatic injuries.

Degloving injuries can be categorized as either open or closed. Closed injuries are not open to the external world and the underlying structures are not visible. In open injuries, the skin is torn back so that the underlying structures are visible. Such an injury could thus resemble the process of removing a glove from a hand.

The treatment of a degloving injury requires assessment of the damage to the soft tissue and associated blood vessels. Any soft tissue that is dead must be removed. If the soft tissue that was torn away is healthy and has a blood supply, it can be used in the treatment. Replantation and revascularization are when the soft tissue that was torn away is reattached with proper blood flow. In cases where reattachment can't occur, skin flaps or skin grafting may be done.

== Closed internal degloving injury (Morel-Lavallée lesion) ==
The term Morel-Lavallée lesion is an eponym for a closed internal degloving injury. The injury is named after a French physician who first described the injury.

A closed internal degloving injury is a separation between the layers of soft tissue which creates a space that is internal and closed off from the outside world. The new space acts as a pocket with the potential to fill with fluids.

=== Mechanism ===
The injury occurs due to trauma that results in a shearing force. This force causes the layer of fat below the skin, the superficial fascia, to separate from the deep fascia and muscle beneath. This separation also damages blood and lymphatic vessels. Blood and lymphatic fluid can then fill the space that was created. During healing, the breakdown of the red blood cells can create inflammation. The inflammation can be chronic and lead to the formation of a fibrous capsule. The fibrous capsule is a layer that covers the inside of the lesion. This layer isn't normally present and is the body's response to the inflammation. The formation of a capsule prevents any absorption of fluids that would occur during the healing process.

=== Causes ===
Morel-Lavallée lesions are a result of traumatic injuries such as high-energy motor vehicle crashes, or crush injuries. Blunt force injuries, even at lower velocities, such as falls, bicycle accidents, or sports injuries also result in the injury. Instances of Morel-Lavallée lesions post-operatively after liposuction and abdominoplasty have also occurred.

=== Presentation ===
The development of signs and symptoms that clinically indicate a Morel-Lavallée lesion can occur quickly or slowly. The clinical presentation time frame ranges from hours to days after an injury and in some cases months to years.

Visually, the area of the injury may have obvious signs or appear normal externally despite underlying damage. This range of presentation can make an immediate clinical diagnosis difficult. Although this injury is internal, changes to the outside appearance of the skin can indicate the presence of the injury. Damage to the skin can show up as the following signs:

- Bruising
- Swelling
- Cracking
- Drying
- Abrasions

Fluid that fills the new space can be a part of the clinical presentation. This can present as swelling that is soft with fluid that can be felt beneath the skin. An acute clinical presentation will likely have bruising, swelling, and pain. The potential to accumulate fluids in the space has specific consequences. Hypovolemic shock can occur in patients where severe blood loss occurs and fills the space. The presence of fluid can also exert a pressure that then will cause death, necrosis, of the skin. Additionally, the fluid collection can become infected.

The ability of the skin to move more than it should, skin hypermobility, can also occur. This increase in mobility occurs because the skin is no longer attached to the underlying muscle. Symptoms can include decreased sensation to the area because of damage to nerves responsible for sensation. Delayed presentation shows up as a painful swelling and stretching of the skin that slowly enlarges over time. Capsule formation can occur in a Morel-Lavallée lesion that presents later or becomes chronic.

Morel-Lavallée lesions can occur anywhere in the body, but the most common areas are the knee, hip, and thigh. The lesions generally form in areas of the body where the skin is more easily detached from the muscle. This occurs in places where the bone has natural protrusions and where the skin naturally has more mobility. Adults are more likely to have Morel-Lavallée lesions in the hip and thigh. Children are more likely to have lesions in the leg from the knee downward.

Since Morel-Lavallée lesions occur in traumas, patients may have multiple injuries of varying severity. In poly-traumas, life-threatening injuries take immediate priority and can distract from recognizing the lesion. This can delay or complicate recognizing and diagnosing the injury.

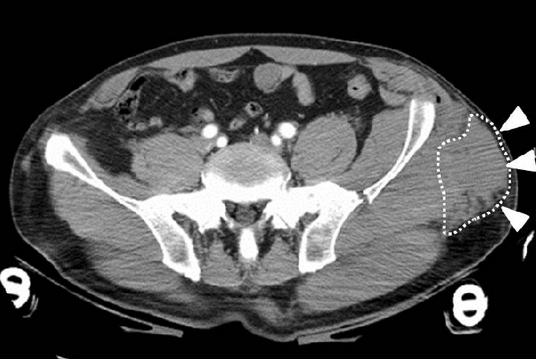
Computed tomography (CT) image of the pelvis depicting a closed internal degloving injury (Morel-Lavallée lesion). CT is shown in the axial plane. The white dotted lines and white arrows indicate a collection of blood inside the lesion. A fracture of the left iliac wing is also visible on the CT.

=== Diagnosis ===
The diagnosis of a Morel-Lavallée lesion can be made based from clinical observations or medical imaging. Imaging can confirm a diagnosis or detect an injury that was not clinically apparent. Morel-Lavallée lesions can be detected with several types of medical imaging. Each one has its own benefits and limitations. A lesion can be distinguished as acute or chronic based on features present in the imaging. Computed tomography is often the first imaging used in diagnosis. This is because computed tomography is often the first imaging done for patients with traumatic injuries. Magnetic resonance imaging is generally the imaging of choice for obtaining well-defined imaging of the lesion. More information on the types of imaging that can be used are discussed below.

==== Ultrasound imaging ====
Ultrasound imaging can help confirm a clinical diagnosis by visualizing the location of the lesion. Ultrasound can also give information about the presence of fluid beneath the skin. It does not help exclude other possible diagnoses that also have fluid present on ultrasound. A drawback is that ultrasound does not create detailed images of the anatomy in the way that other imaging modalities do.

==== Computed tomography ====
Computed tomography (CT) is important in settings of an emergency or when magnetic resonance imaging is not available. CT will show the presence of a Morel-Lavallée lesion and whether fluid is present. The use of contrast can also help determine if fluid present in a lesion is due to active bleeding.

==== Magnetic resonance imaging ====
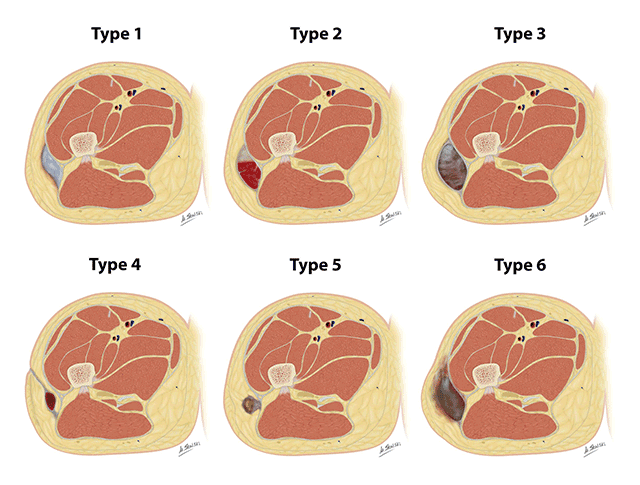
Drawings depicting the types of Morel-Lavallee lesions from the Mellando-Bencardino classification.

Magnetic resonance imaging (MRI) offers detailed imaging of anatomy. This can be useful for more complicated lesions such as an injury surrounding a joint.

The Mellado-Bencardino classification can be used to describe a Morel-Lavallée lesion based on its MRI. The classification categorizes the lesions into types. The classification has six stages listed as Type I to Type VI. The types do not align with specific treatments or outcomes. The stages are based on multiple factors that can be observed on the lesion's MRI. These factors include the following: the shape of the lesion, specific MRI features, and whether a capsule is present.

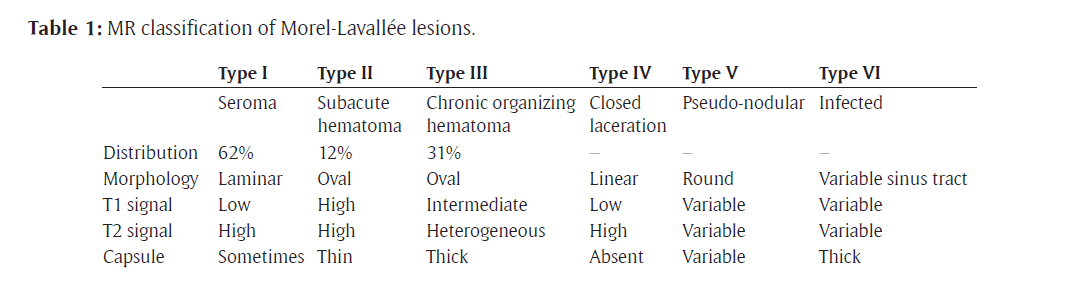
Table listing the qualities used to categorize Morel-Lavallée lesions based on MRI.

=== Treatment ===
Treatment is performed by a physician or a surgeon in cases where surgical intervention is needed. The goal of treating a Morel-Lavallée lesion is to close the space that was created between the superficial and deep fascia. The way the space gets closed will depend on which treatment method is used. There are no specific treatment guidelines that determine which treatment to use. Instead, specific treatment methods are picked based on injury severity. Treatment depends on the situation and the qualities of the lesion. The presence of fluid, a capsule, or dead tissue can all prevent healing. Ultimately, treatment is focused on addressing specific issues so the wound can heal. In general, treatment can fall into the following categories.

==== Conservative therapy ====
Conservative therapy consists of treatment that is not invasive. Conservative therapy can be considered for Morel-Lavallée lesions that have a small amount of fluid and no capsule. Compression bandages can be used to press the layers together and decrease the space. This can then allow for the natural formation of fibrous adhesions between the layers and closing of the space to occur more easily. Conservative treatment is used for small lesions that are in a location on the body that can be easily bandaged.

==== Minimally invasive treatment ====
Minimally invasive treatment includes medical procedures that access the space through the skin to remove fluid and promote healing. The overlying skin needs to be healthy for minimally invasive techniques to be considered. A Morel-Lavallée lesion with a lot of fluid present might need minimally invasive treatment. Lesions that did not heal with conservative therapy can also be considered for minimally invasive techniques.

Fluid in a Morel-Lavallée lesion can be removed by percutaneous aspiration. Aspiration is a technique where the fluid is removed with a needle and suction. Ultrasound or CT imaging can be used to visualize the area beneath the skin when performing the aspiration. Compression bandages can be applied after aspiration to help with healing. Despite aspiration, fluid can recur. Catheters or surgical drains can be left in the space so that any new fluid accumulation after aspiration can drain outside of the body.

Minimally invasive surgery can be done with one or several small incisions. Drainage and irrigation can be performed through the small incisions. Irrigation, flushing a sterile liquid like saline in the wound, allows the space to get cleaned out. Video-assisted endoscopic debridement is an option that allows the surgeon to use a camera to see inside the lesion. The surgeon is able to see inside the space while performing any necessary debridement, drainage, and irrigation. For lesions with a capsule, video assisted endoscopic debridement can help remove the capsule.

Sclerodesis or sclerotherapy is also an option to close the space by causing fibrotic scarring or sclerosis. In this process different chemical compounds, known to be sclerosing agents, are injected to cause the scarring process. Sclerosing agents are substances that lead to fibrosis and therefore scar formation. The fibrosis helps the layers adhere together again. Fibrosis occurs because the agents lead to inflammation and growth of cells called fibroblasts. The fibroblasts then help create the fibrosis that adheres the layers back together. Sclerosing agents include medications like doxycycline, erythromycin, vancomycin as well as other agents like ethanol, talc, and fibrin glue. Promoting adhesion with sclerosing agents can also prevent fluid from recurring once the space is closed. This treatment can be used for patients with lesions that don't heal after bandaging or aspiration.

==== Open surgery ====
Open surgery is required in Morel-Lavallée lesions that are large and have extensive damage to the soft-tissues. Patients with bone fractures beneath the Morel-lavallée lesion can benefit from an open surgery. Lesions that persist despite minimally invasive techniques will also need open surgery. Patients with skin that has died, necrosed, will often need the dead tissue cut out by a surgeon. Depending on how much tissue is removed, a patient may need reconstructive surgery. Reconstruction can include skin grafts or flaps. Skin grafting and flap procedures use the patient's own healthy soft tissues to heal a wound. Debridement describes the process of surgically removing unhealthy tissue from an area. After an injury, portions of the soft tissue may be able to survive while other parts may be dead. Removal of the dead tissue helps with the healing process. Open debridement can occur with or without reconstruction. Any portions of the tissue that are dead will be cut out by a surgeon. Specific suturing techniques, progressive tension or quilting, can also be used to pull the layers closer together using stitches.

Additional considerations should be taken for Pain management, physiotherapy and long term care

== Other animals ==
Many small mammals are able to induce degloving of their tails to escape capture; this is comparable to tail autotomy in reptiles.
