= Melanocytic oral lesion =

- Specialty: Dermatology

Melanocytic oral lesions are an extremely uncommon condition characterized by pigmented lesions of the mucous membranes.

== See also ==
- Mucosal squamous cell carcinoma
- Oral florid papillomatosis
