= SLAP tear =

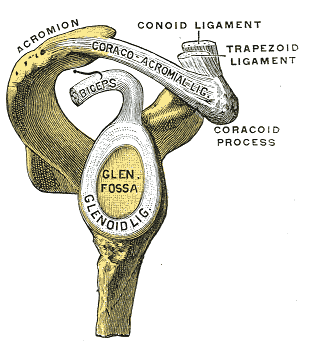
- Glenoid fossa of right side. (Glenoidal labrum labeled as "glenoid lig.")
- Specialty: Orthopedic surgery

A SLAP tear or SLAP lesion is an injury to the superior glenoid labrum (fibrocartilaginous rim attached around the margin of the glenoid cavity in the shoulder blade) that initiates in the back of the labrum and stretches toward the front into the attachment point of the long head of the biceps tendon. SLAP is an acronym for "Superior Labrum Anterior and Posterior". SLAP lesions are commonly seen in overhead throwing athletes but middle-aged labor workers can also be affected, and they can be caused by chronic overuse or an acute stretch injury of the shoulder.

== Symptoms ==
Several symptoms are common but not specific:

- Dull, throbbing, ache in the joint which can be brought on by very strenuous exertion or simple household chores.
- Difficulty sleeping due to shoulder discomfort. The SLAP lesion decreases the stability of the joint which, when combined with lying in bed, causes the shoulder to drop.
- For an athlete involved in a throwing sport, such as baseball, volleyball, handball, and cricket, pain and a catching feeling are prevalent. Throwing athletes may also complain of a loss of strength or significant decreased velocity in throwing.
- Any applied force overhead or pushing directly into the shoulder can result in impingement and catching sensations.

== Anatomical mechanism ==
The shoulder joint is a "ball-and-socket" joint. However, the 'socket' (the glenoid fossa of the scapula) is small, covering at most only a third of the 'ball' (the head of the humerus). It is deepened by a circumferential rim of fibrocartilage, the glenoidal labrum. Previously there was debate as to whether the labrum was fibrocartilaginous as opposed to hyaline cartilage found in the remainder of the glenoid fossa. Previously, it was considered a redundant, evolutionary remnant, but is now considered integral to shoulder stability. Most agree that the proximal tendon of the long head of the biceps brachii muscle becomes fibrocartilaginous prior to attaching to the superior aspect of the glenoid. The long head of the triceps brachii inserts inferiorly, similarly. Together, all of those cartilaginous extensions are termed the 'glenoid labrum'.

A SLAP tear or lesion occurs when there is damage to the superior (uppermost) area of the labrum. These lesions have come into public awareness because of their frequency in athletes involved in overhead and throwing activities in turn relating to relatively recent description of labral injuries in throwing athletes, and initial definitions of the 4 (major) SLAP sub-types, all happening since the 1990s. The identification and treatment of these injuries continues to evolve.

== Diagnosis ==
=== Sub-types ===
Twelve varieties of SLAP lesion have been described, with initial diagnosis by MRI or arthrography and confirmation by direct arthroscopy.

- Type I - 11 o'clock to 1 o'clock. Fraying of the superior labrum, though it remains firmly attached to the glenoid rim.
- Type II - 11 o'clock to 1 o'clock. Tear of biceps labral complex
  - Type IIa - 11 o'clock to 3 o'clock. Primarily anterior.
  - Type IIb - 9 o'clock to 11 o'clock. Primarily posterior.
  - Type IIc - 9 o'clock to 3 o'clock. Combined anterior and posterior.
- Type III - 11 o'clock to 3 o'clock. Bucket-handle tears of the superior portion of the labrum without involvement of the biceps brachii (long head) attachment.
- Type IV - 11 o'clock to 1 o'clock. Bucket-handle tears of the superior portion of the labrum extending into the biceps tendon.
- Type V - 11 o'clock to 5 o'clock. Anteroinferior Bankart lesion that extends upward to include a separation of the biceps tendon.
- Type VI - 11 o'clock to 1 o'clock. Unstable radial flap tears associated with separation of the biceps anchor.
- Type VII - 11 o'clock to 3 o'clock. Anterior extension of the SLAP lesion beneath the middle glenohumeral ligament.
- Type VIII - 7 o'clock to 1 o'clock. Extension into posterior labrum, more extension than type IIb.
- Type IX - 7 o'clock to 5 o'clock. Circumferentially abnormal labrum.
- Type X - 11 o'clock to at least 1 o'clock. Extension into rotator cuff interval.
- Type XI - Extends into superior glenohumeral ligament
- Type XII - Superior labrum anterior cuff lesion

== Treatment ==
There is evidence in literature to support both surgical and non-surgical forms of treatment. In some, physical therapy can strengthen the supporting muscles in the shoulder joint to the point of reestablishing stability.

Surgical treatment of SLAP tears has become more common in recent years. The success rate for repairing isolated SLAP tears is reported between 74-94%. While surgery can be performed as a traditional open procedure, an arthroscopic technique is currently favored being less intrusive with low chance of iatrogenic infection.

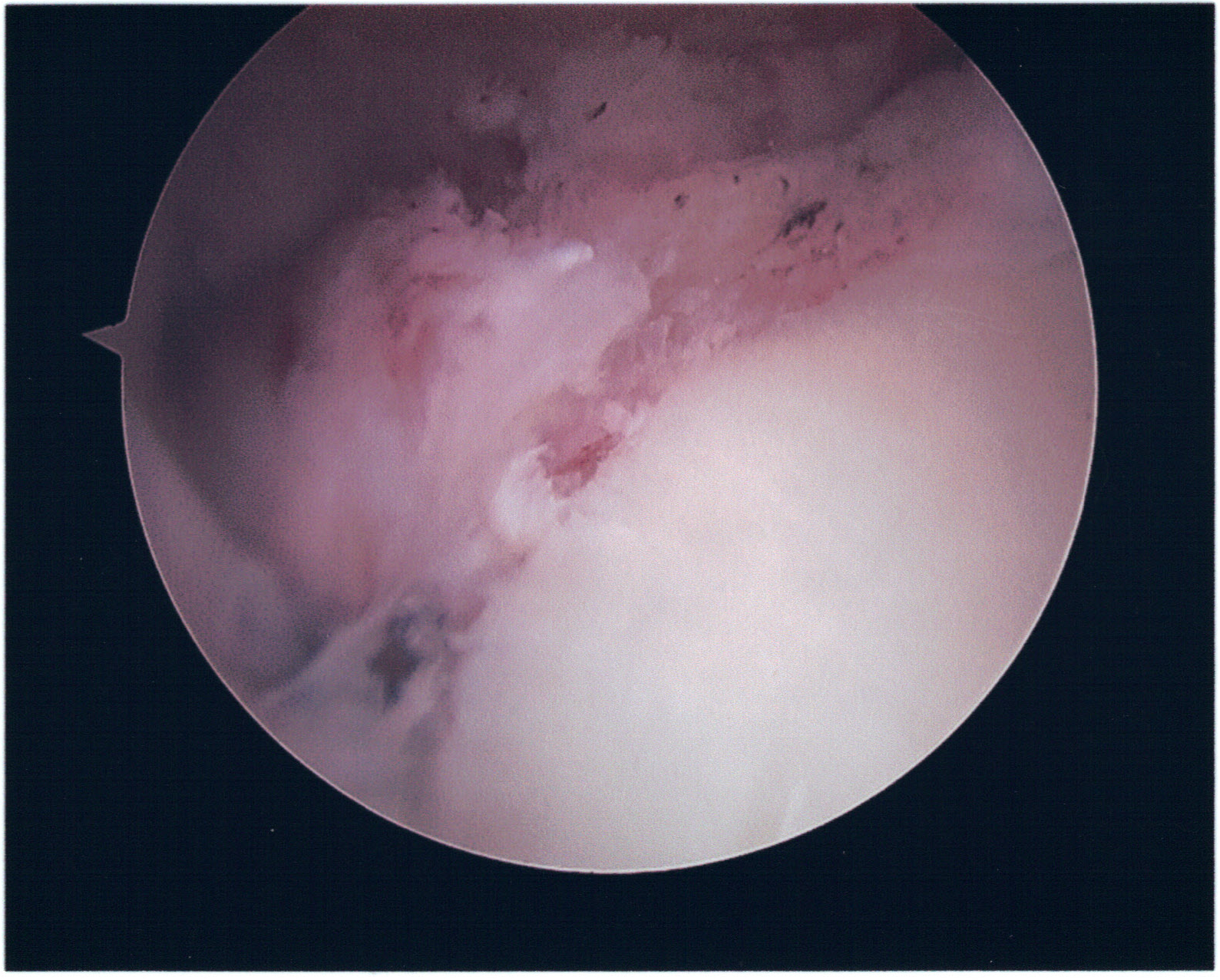
SLAP Tear

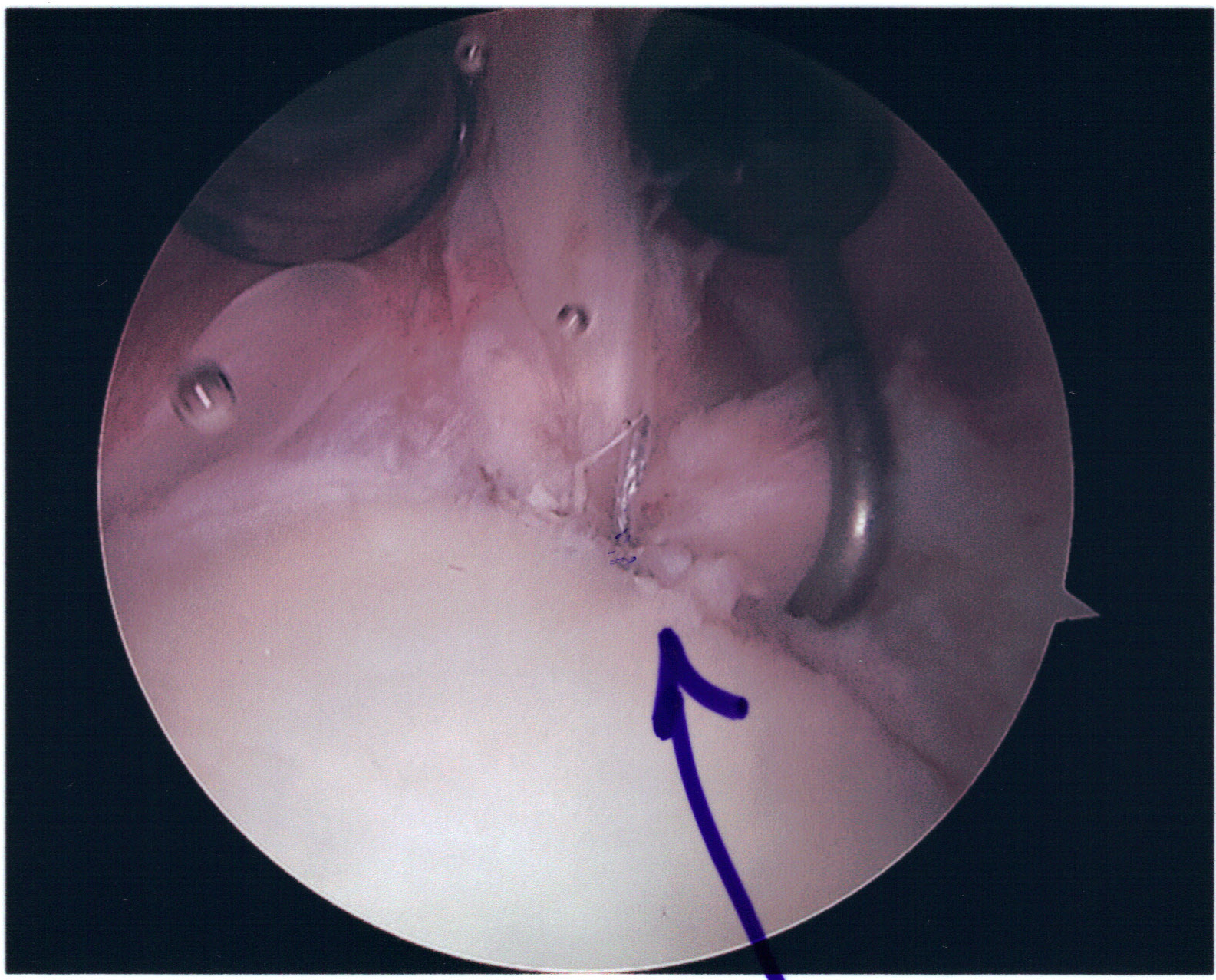
Repair of SLAP Tear

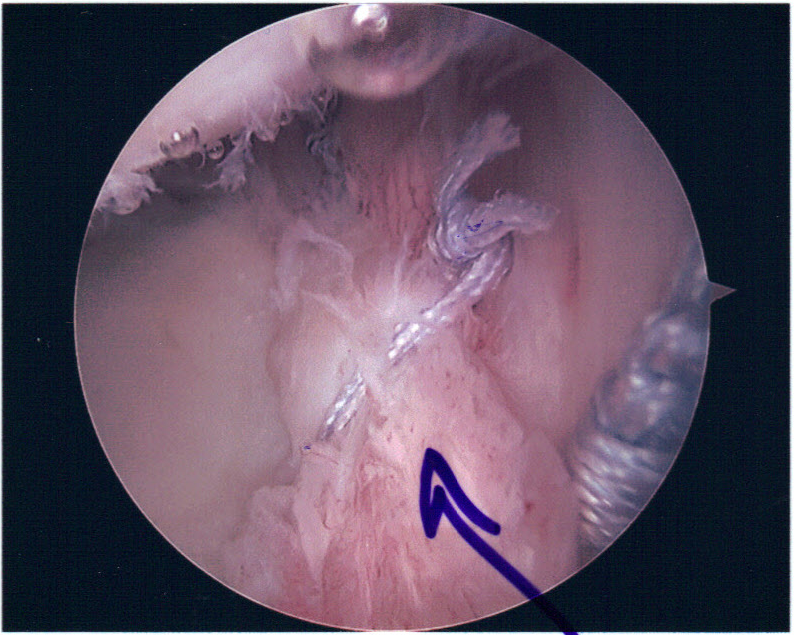
Repair of SLAP tear

Associated findings within the shoulder joint are varied, may not be predictable and include:

- SLAP lesion – labrum/glenoid separation at the tendon of the biceps muscle
- Bankart lesion – labrum/glenoid separation at the inferior glenohumeral ligament
- Biceps Tendon - exclusion of pulley injury
- Bone – glenoid, humerus — injury or degenerative change involving joint surface
- Anatomical variants — sublabral foramen, Buford Complex (these are important to differentiate, as operating on them can lead to iatrogenic stiffness)

Although good outcomes with SLAP repair over the age of 40 are reported, both age greater than 40 and Workmen's Compensation status have been noted as independent predictors of surgical complications. This is particularly so if there is an associated rotator cuff injury. In such circumstances, it is suggested that labral debridement and biceps tenotomy is preferred.

SLAP (Superior Labral Tear, Anterior to Posterior)

- Type 1
- Fraying of Superior Labrum
- Biceps Anchor Intact
- Type 2
- Superior Labrum detached
- Detachment of the Biceps Anchor
- Type 3
- Bucket Handle type tear of Superior Labrum
- Biceps Anchor INTACT
- Type 4
- Bucket Handle tear of Superior Labrum
- Extension of tear in Biceps Tendon
- Part of Biceps Anchor still INTACT

=== Procedure ===
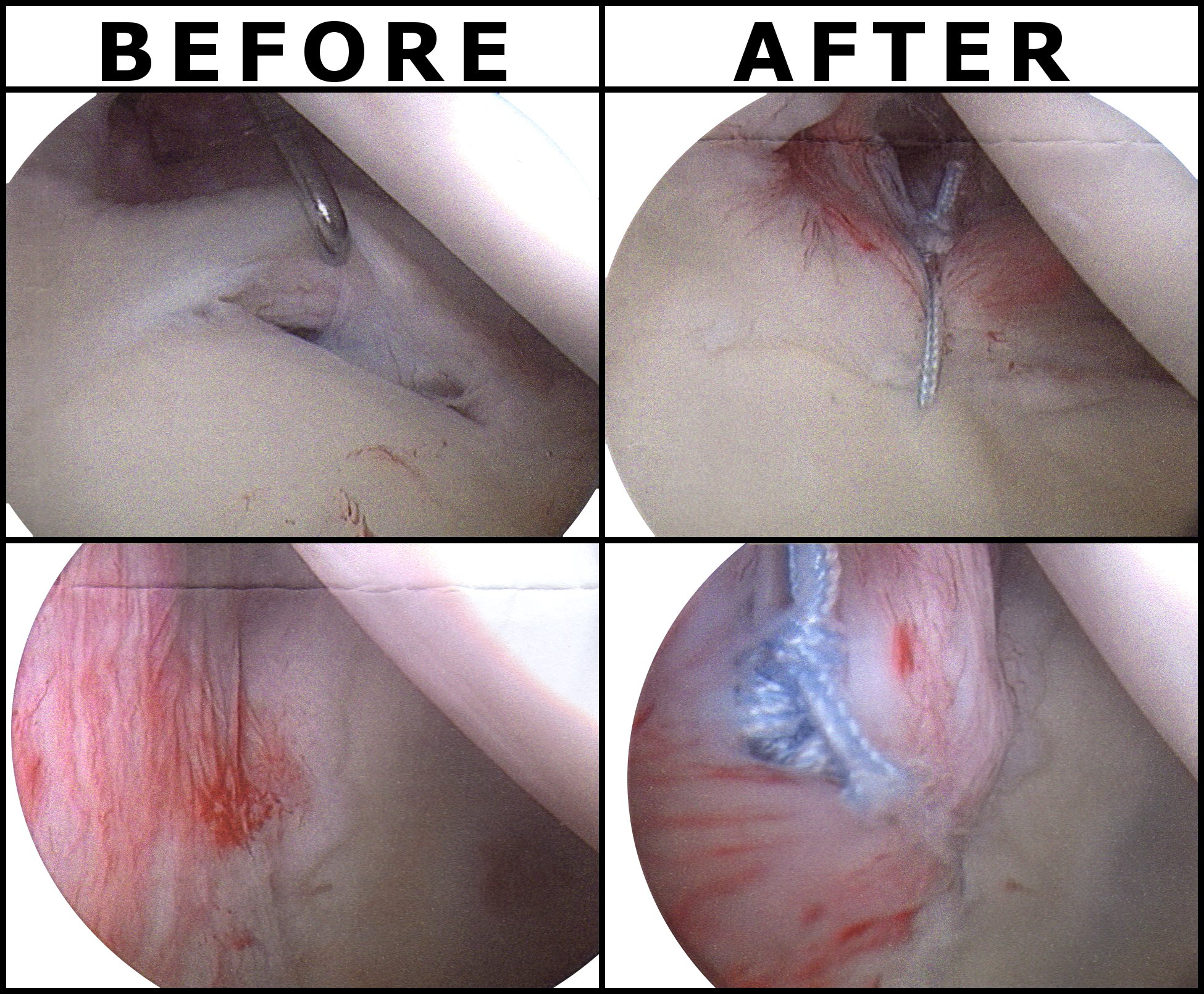
Arthroscopic SLAP Lesion (type 2) repair

Following inspection and determination of the extent of injury, the basic labrum repair is as follows.

- The glenoid and labrum are roughened to increase contact surface area and promote re-growth.
- Locations for the bone anchors are selected based on number and severity of tear. A severe tear involving both SLAP and Bankart lesions may require seven anchors. Simple tears may only require one.
- The glenoid is drilled for the anchor implantation.
- Anchors are inserted in the glenoid.
- The suture component of the implant is tied through the labrum and knotted such that the labrum is in tight contact with the glenoid surface.

== Surgical rehabilitation ==
Surgical rehabilitation is vital, progressive and supervised. The first phase focuses on early motion and usually occupies post-surgical weeks one through three. Passive range of motion is restored in the shoulder, elbow, forearm, and wrist joints. However, while manual resistance exercises for scapular protraction, elbow extension, and pronation and supination are encouraged, elbow flexion resistance is avoided because of the biceps contraction that it generates and the need to protect the labral repair for at least six weeks. A sling may be worn, as needed, for comfort. Phase 2, occupying weeks 4 through 6, involves progression of strength and range of motion, attempting to achieve progressive abduction and external rotation in the shoulder joint. Phase 3, usually weeks 6 through 10, permits elbow flexion resistive exercises, now allowing the biceps to come into play on the assumption that the labrum will have healed sufficiently to avoid injury. Thereafter, isokinetic exercises may be commenced from weeks 10 through 12 to 16, for advanced strengthening leading to return to full activity based on post surgical evaluation, strength, and functional range of motion. The periods of isokinetics through final clearance are sometimes referred to as phases four and five.
