= Glenohumeral ligaments =

Ligaments of the shoulder

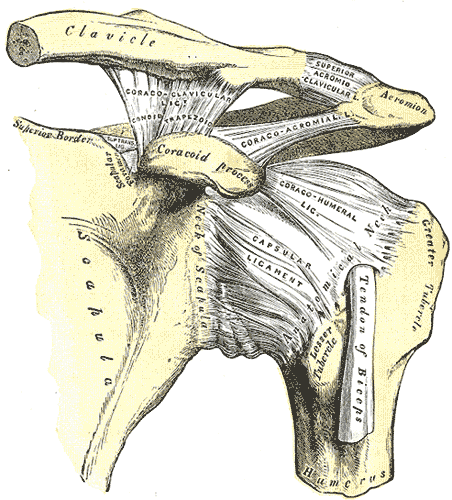
- Ligaments of glenohumeral joint (Glenohumeral ligaments labelled Capsular ligament at centre)

Details
- From: Glenoid cavity
- To: Humerus

Identifiers
- Latin: ligamenta glenohumeralia
- TA98: A03.5.08.003
- TA2: 1766
- FMA: 34961

In human anatomy, the glenohumeral ligaments (GHL) are three ligaments on the anterior side of the glenohumeral joint (i.e. between the glenoid cavity of the scapula and the head of the humerus; colloquially called the shoulder joint). Reinforcing the anterior glenohumeral joint capsule, the superior, middle, and inferior glenohumeral ligaments play different roles in the stability of the head of the humerus depending on arm position and degree of rotation.

== Location ==
The ligaments may be best seen by opening the capsule at the back of the joint and removing the head of the humerus:

- One on the medial side of the joint passes from the medial edge of the glenoid cavity to the lower part of the lesser tubercle of the humerus.
- A second at the lower part of the joint extends from the under edge of the glenoid cavity to the under part of the anatomical neck of the humerus.
- A third at the upper part of the joint is fixed above to the apex of the glenoid cavity close to the root of the coracoid process, and passing downward along the medial edge of the tendon of the Biceps brachii, is attached below to a small depression above the lesser tubercle of the humerus.

In addition to these, the capsule is strengthened in front by two bands derived from the tendons of the Pectoralis major and Teres major respectively.

== Function ==
The most important ligament involved in shoulder joint stability is the Inferior Glenohumeral Ligament. During abduction of the arm, the middle and inferior ligaments become taut while the superior ligament relaxes. The radius of curvature of the head of the humerus is greater superiorly than inferiorly, which further stretches these ligaments so that they keep the articular surfaces of the joint in their close-packed position.

During abduction, the greater tubercle of the humerus comes in contact with the upper margin of the glenoid cavity, which limits maximum abduction. By rotating the humerus laterally, this contact is delayed because the greater tubercle is pulled back so that the bicipital groove faces the coracoacromial ligament. This slightly slackens the inferior fibres of the glenohumeral ligament, allowing an abduction of 90°. Combining abduction with 30° flexion in the plane of the scapula causes a delay in the tightening of the ligament resulting in a maximum abduction of 110°.

During rotation of the arm lateral rotation stretches all three ligaments while medial rotation relaxes them.

Tension of ligaments
Ligament	Shoulder motions to pull the ligament taut	Humeral head motion to pull the ligament taut
Superior glenohumeral lig.	Full adduction	Inferior or anterior glide
Middle glenohumeral lig.	External rotation	Anterior glide
Inferior glenohumeral lig. Anterior band Posterior band	Abduction and external rotation Abduction and internal rotation	Non specific
Coracohumeral lig.	Extremes of flexion, extension, or external rotation	Inferior glide

== See also ==
- Coracohumeral ligament
- Humeral avulsion of the glenohumeral ligament
