= Arthrogram =

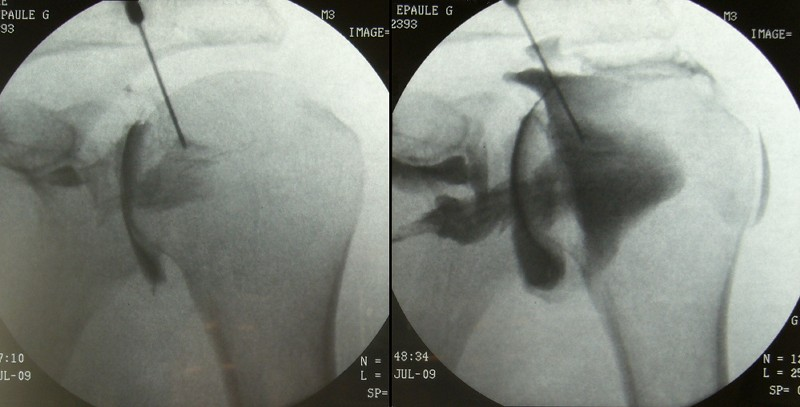
- ICD-9-CM: 88.32
- OPS-301 code: 3-13k

An arthrogram is a series of images of a joint after injection of a contrast medium, usually done by fluoroscopy or MRI. The injection is normally done under a local anesthetic such as Novocain or lidocaine. The radiologist or radiographer performs the study using fluoroscopy or x-ray to guide the placement of the needle into the joint and then injects around 10 ml of contrast based on age. There is some burning pain from the anesthetic and a painful bubbling feeling in the joint after the contrast is injected. This only lasts 20 – 30 hours until the contrast is absorbed. During this time, while it is allowed, it is painful to use the limb for around 10 hours. After that the radiologist can more clearly see what is going on under your skin and can get results out within 24 to 48 hours.

== Types ==
=== Conventional arthrography ===
It is used primarily in the evaluation of menisci, cruciate ligaments, articular cartilage, and loose body within a joint. Fluoroscopic allows general view of the medial, lateral, and patellofemoral ligaments of the joint, overall cartilage thickness, focal defects, imbibition (absorption} of contrast material into the articular cartilage (a sign of cartilage fibrillation - splaying and fraying of the cartilage).

=== CT arthrography ===
CT arthrography is used to examine the patellofemoral joint.

=== MR arthrography ===
MR sequences such as spin echo with T1 and T2-weighted sequences, inversion recovery, chemical shift selective techniques, and gradient echo techniques are used to examine the articular cartilage.

== Use ==
Shoulder arthrography can be used to study tears of the rotator cuff, glenoid labrum and biceps. The type of contrast injected into the joint depends on the subsequent imaging that is planned. For pneumoarthrography, gas is used, for CT or radiographs, a water-soluble radiopaque contrast, and for MRI, gadolinium. Double-contrast arthrography can be used for more anatomically complex cases, though its use is relatively infrequent. The needle is radiographically guided into the glenohumeral joint space, after which the patient is evaluated by fluoroscopy, CT or MRI. The gadolinium in the contrast fluid yields a bright signal on T1 weighted images allowing for better evaluation of the joint capsule, the articular surface of the bones and, in particular, the labral cartilage. MR arthrography is most often used in evaluation of the hip and acetabular labrum, of the shoulder rotator cuff and glenoid labrum, and less often in the wrist. Arthrograms can be diagnostic and therapeutic. Therapeutic arthrograms often distend the joint with cortisone and lidocaine, with a common site being the shoulder. Diagnostic arthrograms can be direct, as described above with penetration of the joint, or indirect, by a venous injection of contrast material and delayed imaging with CT or MRI.

== Risks ==
Patients who are allergic to or sensitive to medications, contrast dyes, local anesthesia, iodine, or latex should not have this procedure. Potential risks are infections at the puncture site where the radiopaque substance and/or air are injected. Bleeding is also a small risk. Rarely, gadolinium, found in MRI contrast agents, can cause nephrogenic systemic fibrosis (NSF), a debilitating and potentially fatal disease affecting skin, muscle, and internal organs, in patients with impaired renal function.

== See also ==
- Medical Imaging
- Radiographer
- Radiologist
