= Latarjet procedure =

Surgical procedure on shoulder dislocations

The Latarjet operation, also known as the Latarjet-Bristow procedure, is a surgical procedure used to treat recurrent shoulder dislocations, typically caused by bone loss or a fracture of the glenoid. The procedure was first described by French surgeon Dr. Michel Latarjet in 1954.

== Mechanism ==
The mechanism of action has been described as a triple blocking effect:

1. conjoint tendon of shoulder i.e short head of the biceps and coracobrachialis, acting as a sling on the subscapularis and capsule with the arm abducted and externally rotated;
2. increasing or restoring the glenoid bone; and
3. repair of the capsule to the stump of coracoacromial ligament.

== Procedure ==
The Latarjet procedure involves the removal and transfer of a section of the coracoid process and its attached muscles to the front of the glenoid. This placement of the coracoid acts as a bone block which, combined with the transferred muscles acting as a strut, prevents further dislocation of the joint. In layman's terms, this procedure involves removing a piece of bone from another part of the shoulder, and attaching it to the front of your shoulder socket. The bone will then act as a barrier which will physically block the shoulder from slipping out of the socket, while the muscles which are transferred with the bone will give additional stability to the joint.

== Effectiveness ==
While the Latarjet procedure can be used for surgical treatment of most cases of shoulder dislocations or subluxation, it is particularly indicated in cases with bone defects. The failure rate following arthroscopic Bankart repair has been shown to dramatically increase from 4% to 67% in patients with significant bone loss. The same authors subsequently reported much improved results when the Latarjet operation was used in patients with bone loss. A number of technical variations have been proposed including both open and arthroscopic variations. Complication rates are between 15–30%, with long-term issues such as graft osteolysis continuing to be an issue with the procedure.

With appropriate patient selection, the Latarjet procedure can be expected to prevent recurrent anterior instability in approximately 94–99% of cases. Full recovery can take six months; however, the majority of activities can be resumed after three. The main long-term side effect is reduced external rotation range in the shoulder.

The Latarjet operation has also been demonstrated to be successful in contact athletes and rugby players.

In summary, the Latarjet operation may ideally be suited as the shoulder reconstruction procedure of choice for contact athletes, patients with increased shoulder laxity, failed previous shoulder reconstructions or if there is significant bone damage.
