= Avulsion injury =

Injury where a body structure is torn off

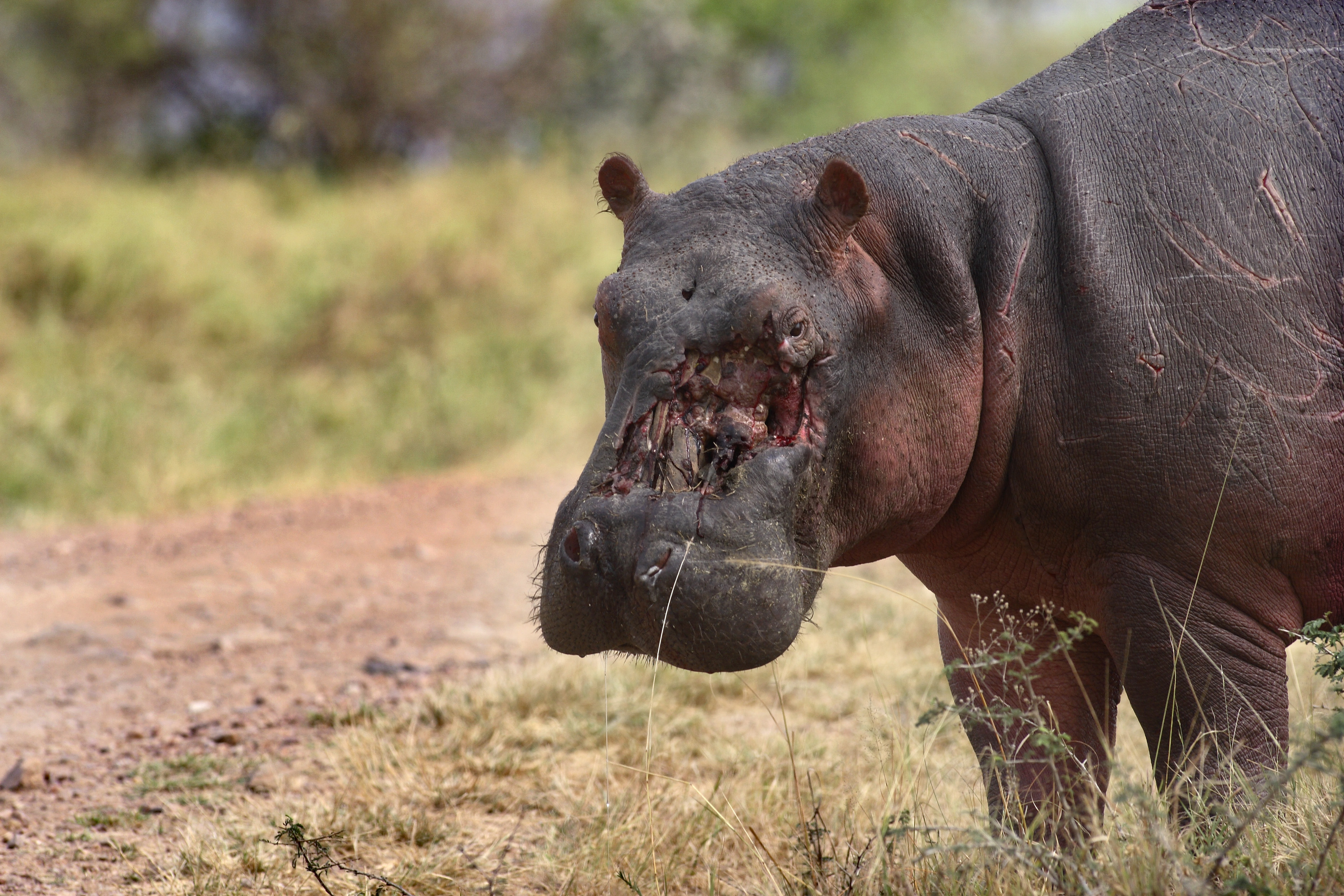
A hippopotamus with an avulsion injury to its face

In medicine, an avulsion is an injury in which a body structure is torn off by either trauma or surgery. The term most commonly refers to a surface trauma where all layers of the skin have been torn away, exposing the underlying structures (i.e., subcutaneous tissue, muscle, tendons, or bone). This is similar to an abrasion but more severe, as body parts such as an eyelid or an ear can be partially or fully detached from the body.

== Etymology ==
In Early Modern English the term is found in the writing of Henry Peacham in his 1622 work: The compleat gentleman. In the various classical sources shown for avello in LSJ none obviously specifically refer to a physically injurious act or injury. Pliny Naturalis historia Euboea avolsa Boeotiae (Plin. 4, 12, 21, § 63) exists also in Peacham as Eubœa from Boetia. Virgil Aeneid Book II, Lines 557-8 Iacet ingēns lītore truncus, āvulsumque umerīs caput et sine nōmine corpus specifically indicate physical injury. (Note: In the sense "To separate from something by pulling, to part, to remove" avello is similar to vello "to pluck or pull", including of hair. The Greek word βάλλω, as Low diacritic (so transliteration C) of LSJ is "vallo", usage from Illiad (καὶ βάλεν οὐδ᾽ ἀφάμαρτε Il.15.495): hit with a missile or hand-held weapon. Pelted with rocks or stones (Iliad, Ajax); pelt The katapeltikon non-torsion catapult was invented 399 BC. LSJ Transliteration A & B (ballo): cannonball)

== Skin avulsions ==
The most common avulsion injury, skin avulsion, often occurs during motor vehicle collisions. The severity of avulsion ranges from skin flaps (minor) to degloving (moderate) and amputation of a finger or limb (severe). Suprafascial avulsions are those in which the depth of the removed skin reaches the subcutaneous tissue layer, while subfascial avulsions extend deeper than the subcutaneous layer. Small suprafascial avulsions can be repaired by suturing, but most avulsions require skin grafts or reconstructive surgery.

=== Rock climbing ===
In rock climbing, a "flapper" is an injury in which parts of the skin are torn off, resulting in a loose flap of skin on the fingers. This is usually the result of friction forces between the climber's fingers and the holds, arising when the climber slips off a hold.

To fix this injury and to be able to continue climbing, many climbers will apply sports tape to the flapped finger to cover up the sensitive area of broken skin. Some climbers may even use super-glue to adhere the loose skin back to the finger.

== Ear avulsions ==
The ear is particularly vulnerable to avulsion injuries because of its position on the side of the head. The most common cause of ear avulsions are bite injuries, primarily human-inflicted, followed by motor vehicle accidents, burns, and complications resulting from otoplasty. A partially avulsed ear can be reattached through suturing or microvascular surgery, depending on the severity of the injury. Microvascular surgery can also be used to reattach a completely avulsed ear, but its success rate is lower because of the need for venous drainage. The ear can also be reconstructed with cartilage and skin grafts or an external ear prosthesis can be made by an anaplastologist.

== Eyelid avulsions ==
Eyelid avulsions are uncommon, but can be caused by motor vehicle collisions, dog bites, or human bites. Eyelid avulsions are repaired by suturing after a CT scan is performed to determine where damage to the muscles, nerves, and blood vessels of the eyelid has occurred. More severe injuries require reconstruction, however, this usually results in some loss of function and subsequent surgeries may be necessary to improve structure and function. Microvascular surgery is another method of repair but is rarely used to treat eye avulsions. Sometimes botulinum toxin is injected into the eyelid to paralyze the muscles while the eyelid heals.

== Nail avulsions ==
Trauma to the nail can cause the nail plate to be torn from the nail bed. Unlike other types of avulsion, when a nail is lost, it is not typically reattached. Following the loss of the nail, the nail bed forms a germinal layer which hardens as the cells acquire keratin and becomes a new nail. Until this layer has formed, the exposed nail bed is highly sensitive, and is typically covered with a non-adherent dressing, as an ordinary dressing will stick to the nail bed and cause pain upon removal. In the average person, fingernails require 3 to 6 months to regrow completely, while toenails require 12 to 18 months.

== Brachial plexus avulsions ==
In brachial plexus avulsions, the brachial plexus (a bundle of nerves that communicates signals between the spine and the arms, shoulders, and hands) is torn from its attachment to the spinal cord. One common cause of brachial plexus avulsions is when a baby's shoulders rotate in the birth canal during delivery, which causes the brachial plexus to stretch and tear. It occurs in 1 to 2 out of every 1,000 births. Shoulder trauma during motor vehicle collisions is another common cause of brachial plexus avulsions. Detachment of the nerves can cause pain and loss of function in the arms, shoulders, and hands. Neuropathic pain can be treated with medication, but it is only through surgical reattachment or nerve grafts that function can be restored. For intractable pain, a procedure called dorsal root entry zone (DREZ) lesioning can be effective.

== Tooth avulsions ==
During a tooth avulsion, a tooth is completely or partially (such that the dental pulp is exposed) detached from its socket. Secondary (permanent) teeth can be replaced and stabilised by a dentist. Primary (baby) teeth are not replaced because they tend to become infected and interfere with the growth of the secondary teeth. A completely avulsed tooth that is replaced within one hour of the injury can be permanently retained. The long-term retention rate decreases as the time that the tooth is detached increases, and eventually root resorption makes replacement of the tooth impossible. To minimize damage to the root, the tooth should be kept in milk or sterile saline while it is outside the mouth.

== Periosteal avulsions ==
During a periosteal avulsion, the periosteum (a fibrous layer that surrounds a bone) detaches the bone's surface. An example of a periosteal avulsion is an ALPSA (anterior labral periosteal sleeve avulsion).

== Surgical avulsions ==
An avulsion is sometimes performed surgically to relieve symptoms of a disorder, or to prevent a chronic condition from recurring. Small incision avulsion (also called ambulatory phlebectomy) is used to remove varicose veins from the legs in disorders such as chronic venous insufficiency. A nail avulsion is performed to remove all or part of a chronic ingrown nail. Facial nerve avulsion is used to treat the involuntary twitching involved in benign essential blepharospasm. However, it often requires additional surgeries to retain function and botulinum toxin injections have been shown to be more effective than surgical avulsions in treating benign essential blepharospasm, while causing fewer complications.

== See also ==
- Degloving
- Physical trauma
- Plastic surgery
- Skin grafting
