= Chronic scar keratosis =

- Other names: Chronic cicatrix keratosis
- Specialty: Dermatology

A chronic scar keratosis is a precancerous skin lesion that arises within a long-standing scar.
