= ALPSA lesion =

Type of shoulder injury

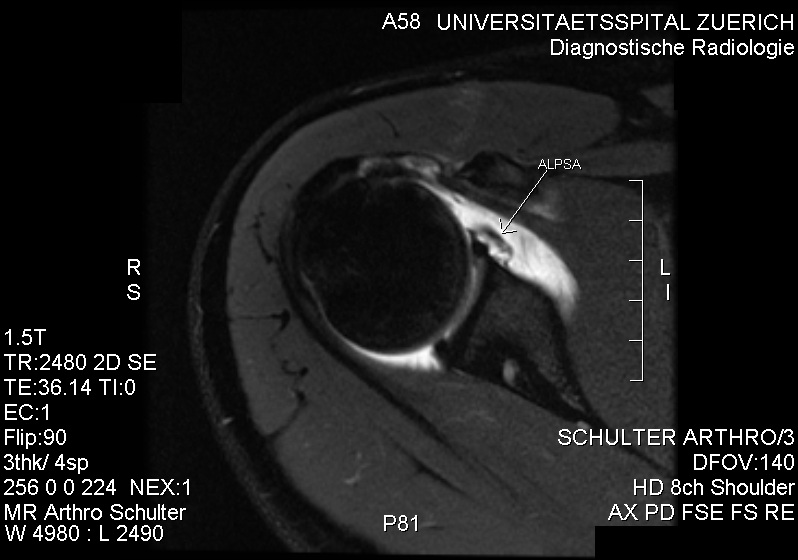
- PD-weighted MRI with fat saturation of the shoulder showing an ALPSA lesion

An ALPSA (anterior labral periosteal sleeve avulsion) lesion is an injury at the front of the shoulder associated with shoulder dislocation.
