= Glenoid fossa =

Part of the shoulder

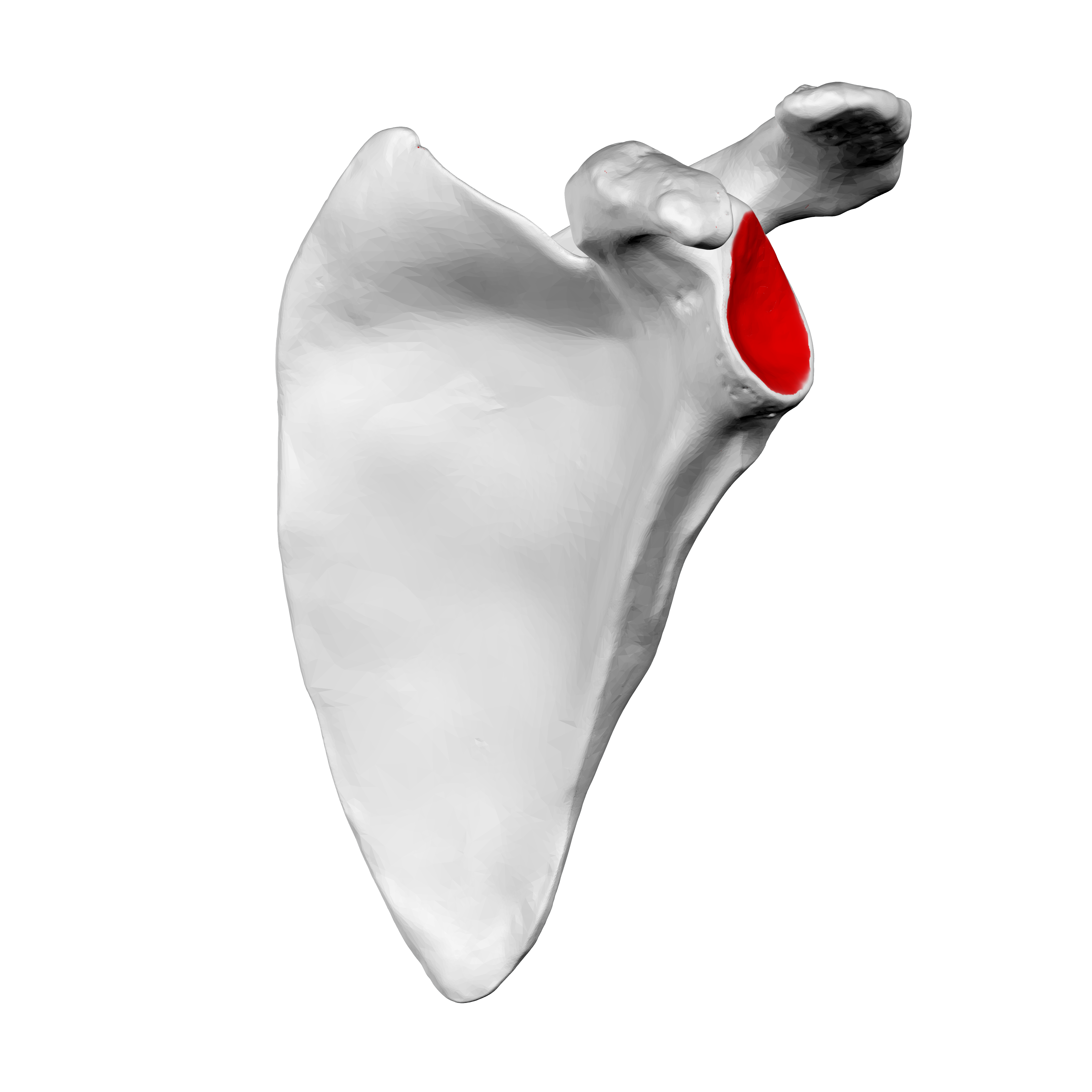
- Costal surface of left scapula. Glenoid cavity shown in red.

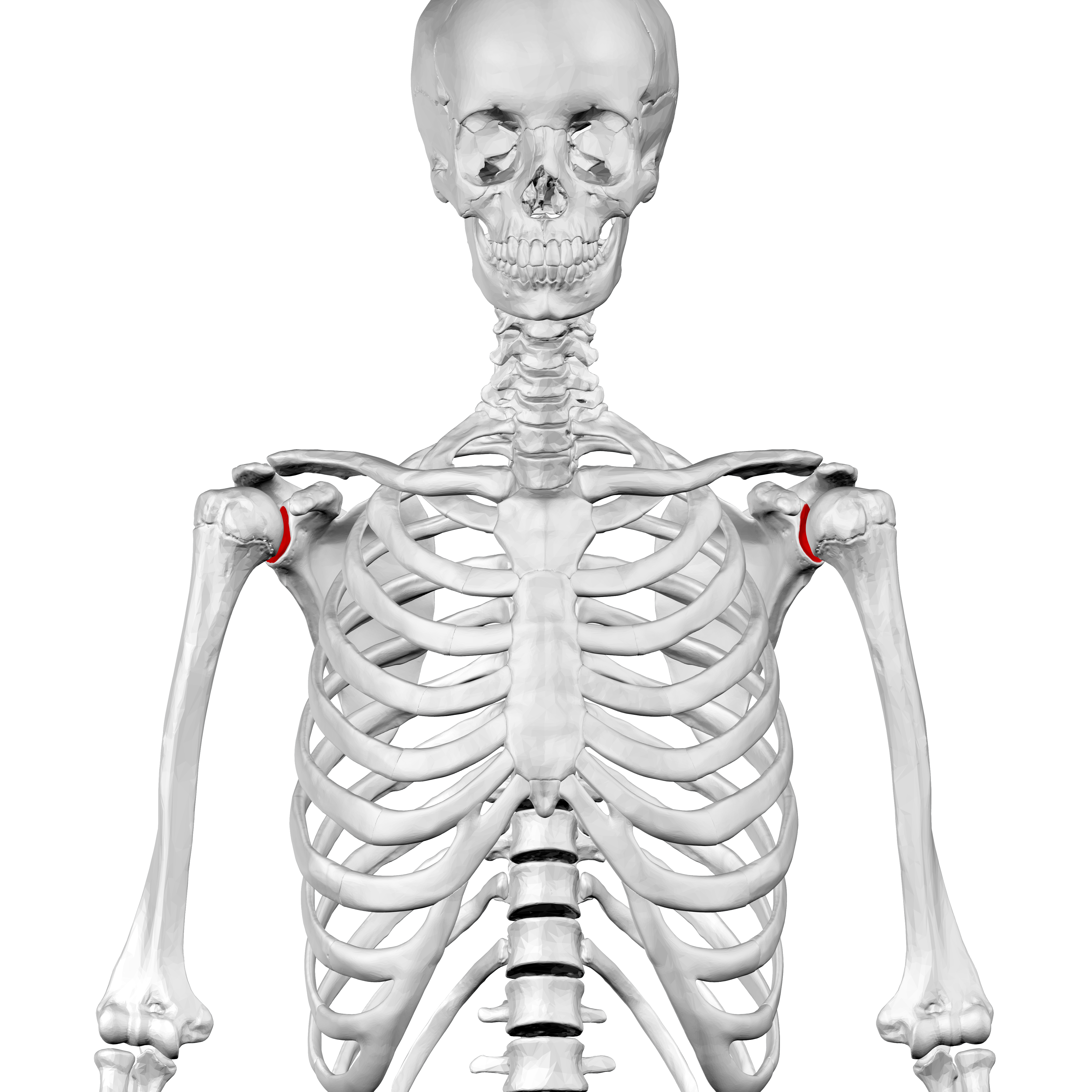
- Glenoid cavity shown in red. This cavity articulates with the head of the humerus.

Details

Identifiers
- Latin: cavitas glenoidalis, fossa glenoidalis
- MeSH: D061165
- TA98: A02.4.01.019
- TA2: 1162
- FMA: 23275

The glenoid fossa of the scapula or the glenoid cavity is a bone part of the shoulder. The word glenoid is pronounced /ˈɡliːnɔɪd/ or /ˈɡlɛnɔɪd/ (both are common) and is from Greek: gléne, "socket", reflecting the shoulder joint's ball-and-socket form. It is a shallow, pyriform articular surface, which is located on the lateral angle of the scapula. It is directed laterally and forward and articulates with the head of the humerus; it is broader below than above and its vertical diameter is the longest.

This cavity forms the glenohumeral joint along with the humerus. This type of joint is classified as a synovial, ball and socket joint. The humerus is held in place within the glenoid cavity by means of the long head of the biceps tendon. This tendon originates on the superior margin of the glenoid cavity and loops over the shoulder, bracing humerus against the cavity. The rotator cuff also reinforces this joint more specifically with the supraspinatus tendon to hold the head of the humerus in the glenoid cavity.

The cavity surface is covered with cartilage in the fresh state, and its margins, slightly raised, give attachment to a fibrocartilaginous structure, the glenoid labrum, which deepens the cavity. This cartilage is very susceptible to tearing. When torn, it is most commonly known as a SLAP lesion which is generally caused by repetitive shoulder movements.

Compared to the acetabulum (at the hip-joint) the glenoid cavity is relatively shallow. This makes the shoulder joint prone to dislocation (luxation). Strong glenohumeral ligaments and muscles prevents dislocation in most cases.

By being so shallow the glenoid cavity allows the shoulder joint to have the greatest mobility of all joints in the body, allowing 120 degrees of unassisted flexion. Additional range of motion in shoulder flexion (typically up to 180 degrees in humans) is also accomplished by the great mobility of the scapula (shoulder blade) through a process known as scapulohumeral rhythm.

== Evolution ==
Interpretations of the fossil remains of Australopithecus africanus (STS 7) and A. afarensis (AL 288-1; a.k.a. Lucy) suggest that the glenoid fossa was oriented more cranially in these species than in modern humans. This reflects the importance of overhead limb postures and suggests a retention of arboreal adaptations in these hominoid primates, whereas the lateral orientation of the glenoid in modern humans reflects the typical lowered position of the arm.

=== In dinosaurs ===
In dinosaurs the main bones of the pectoral girdle were the scapula (shoulder blade) and the coracoid, both of which directly articulated with the clavicle. The place on the scapula where it articulated with the humerus (upper bone of the forelimb) is called the glenoid. The glenoid is important because it defines the range of motion of the humerus.

== Additional images ==
Left scapula. Glenoid cavity shown in red.

Animation. Glenoid cavity shown in red.

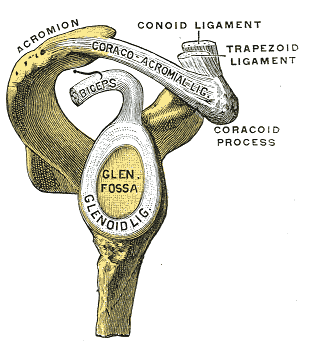
Glenoid fossa of right side.

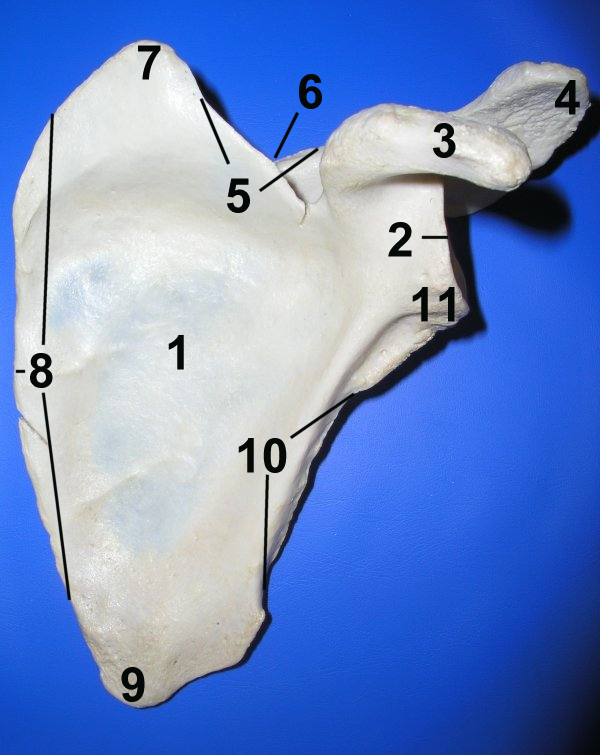
Anterior view of left scapula showing glenoid cavity "2"

Animation of shoulder joint. The muscles shown are subscapularis muscle (at right), infraspinatus muscle (at top left), teres minor muscle (at bottom left).

Animation of glenohumeral joint. The muscle shown is supraspinatus muscle.

== See also ==
- Glenopolar angle
