= Glenoid labrum =

Structure on the shoulder blade

Glenoidal labrum
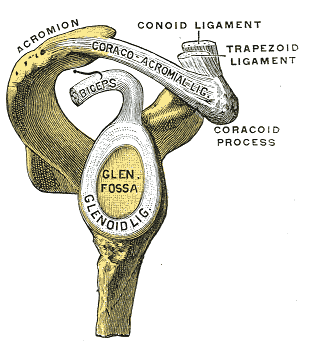
- Lateral view of the shoulder showing the glenoid labrum (marked "glenoid lig.")

Details

Identifiers
- Latin: labrum glenoidale
- TA98: A03.5.08.002
- TA2: 1765
- FMA: 23290

The glenoid labrum (glenoid ligament) is a fibrocartilaginous (but not fibrocartilage, as previously thought) structure attached around the rim of the glenoid cavity on the shoulder blade. The shoulder joint is considered a ball-and-socket joint. However, in bony terms the 'socket' (the glenoid fossa of the scapula) is quite shallow and small, covering at most only a third of the 'ball' (the head of the humerus). The socket is deepened by the glenoid labrum, stabilizing the shoulder joint.

The labrum is triangular in section; the base is fixed to the circumference of the cavity, while the free edge is thin and sharp.

It is continuous above with the tendon of the long head of the biceps brachii, which gives off two fascicles to blend with the fibrous tissue of the labrum.

== Structure ==
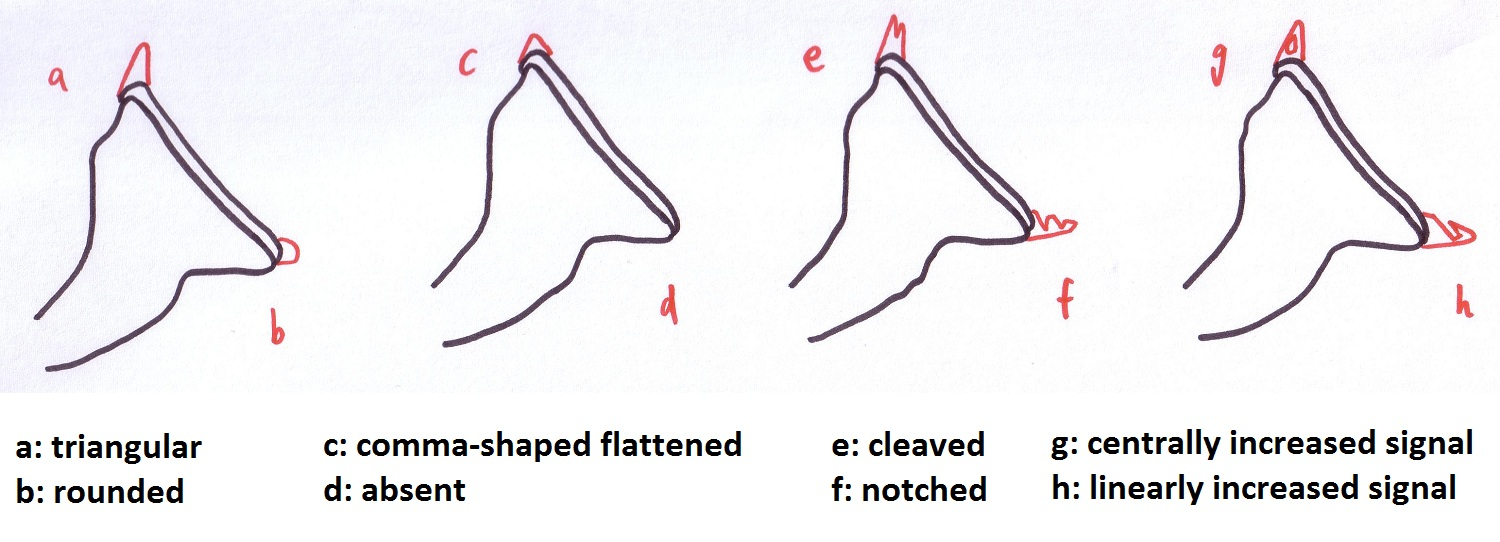
Glenoid labrum. Schematic drawing of the transverse section. Morphologic variants of the glenoid labrum with relative distribution in percentage for the anterior labrum. a: 50%. Triangular with line of increased signal intensity along the hyalin articular cartilage. b: 20%. Rounded. c: 7%. Comma-shaped flattened. d: 3%. Absent. e: 15%. Cleaved. f: 8%. Notched. g: Central increase in signal intensity. h: Linear increase in signal intensity. The posterior labrum generally exhibits a triangular or rounded form.

== Clinical significance ==
=== Injury ===
Tearing of the labrum can occur from either acute trauma or repetitive shoulder motion such as in the sports of swimming, baseball and football. Acute trauma may be from dislocation of the shoulder, direct blows to the shoulder, and other accidents of the sort. Tears are classified as either superior or inferior in regards to where the tear is in the glenoid cavity. A SLAP lesion (superior labrum, anterior to posterior) is a tear where the glenoid labrum meets the tendon of the long head of the biceps muscle. Symptoms include increased pain with overhead activity, popping or grinding, loss of strength, and trouble localizing a specific point of pain. Because a SLAP lesion involves the biceps, pain and weakness may also be felt when performing elbow flexion with resistance.

=== Diagnosis ===
Clinicians can use any combination of the following manual tests to assist in determining if a labral tear has occurred; Jobe Relocation, O'Brien, Anterior Apprehension, Bicipital Groove Tenderness, Crank, Speed, and Yergason tests. As a general rule, abnormal pain experienced during any of these tests will indicate a positive result, or a tear of the glenoid labrum. All of the tests take advantage of the fact that the labrum meets the tendon of the long head of the biceps muscle, and thus will normally produce pain in the region if a tear is present. Additionally, clinicians may order an MRI (Magnetic Resonance Imaging) or CT (Computed Tomography) scan to be conducted utilizing contrast injections to highlight where tears may be present. However, due to inherent variability between humans, manual tests, when possible, are more accurate in determining the presence of a labral tear.

=== Treatment ===
Detachment of the glenoid labrum often requires surgery to reattach it to the glenoid fossa. Arthroscopic surgical techniques can also be used for more minor detachments.

== See also ==
- Bankart lesion
- Hill-Sachs lesion
