= Elbow fracture =

Medical condition

Elbow fractures are any broken bone in or near the elbow joint and include olecranon fractures, supracondylar humerus fractures and radial head fractures. The two most common causes of elbow fractures are direct trauma to the elbow joint or bracing a fall with an extended arm. The elbow joint is formed by the articulation of three different bones: the ulna, radius, and humerus that permit the joint to move like a hinge and allow a person to straighten, bend their arm, and rotate their forearm. These bones are connected by tendons, ligaments, and muscle to form the joint. Due to the complexity of the elbow joint, mechanisms of injury, treatment strategies, and complications differ depending on which bones are affected.

== Adults ==
=== Distal humerus ===
In young healthy bone, distal humerus fractures require a high impact mechanism to break. However, osteoporotic, or weaker bone can break at the distal humerus with lower energy mechanisms such as ground level falls. Unless there is minimal displacement, distal humerus fractures generally require operative intervention. Surgeons will generally place two plates with screws to minimize rotation in the healing process. Complications include ulnar neuritis, and heterotrophic ossification or other elbow stiffness.

=== Radial head ===
Radial head fractures occur as a result of a valgus force, or from the outside towards the body's midline. As such, they occur in isolation, or in combination with other injuries to other structures in a fracture-dislocation. They are characterized by the Mason classification listed below:

- Type I: displaced <2mm, forearm rotation intact.
- Type II: displaced >2mm or angulated.
- Type III: comminuted and displacement that causes reduced forearm rotation.
- Type IV: fracture and associated dislocated elbow.

Only Mason type I fractures are treated non-operatively. If there is displacement, or limit to forearm rotation, a surgeon may choose to either perform and open reduction with plate and screw fixation or replacement of the radial head.

=== Olecranon ===
The most common mechanisms of injury in olecranon fractures is fall on an outstretched hand and trauma directly to the bony process. Olecranon fractures have been described by a variety of classification systems including Mayo, Colton, and Schatzker, but the consensus among orthopedic surgeons is operative management is indicated if there is greater than 2 cm displacement. Conservative management can additionally be considered if the patient is elderly and has minimal demand and weight-bearing of the elbow joint. Operative management includes ORIF with tension band wiring (TBW) or plate and screw fixation. Olecranon fracture lines have a compression side, or side where the ends of bone are compressed when the attached muscles contract and a tension side where the ends of the bone pull apart on contraction of the muscles. TBW allows the tension side of fractures to be converted to compression which encourages bone healing. Tension bands are associated with lower cost, shorter operative times and less bleeding, but have higher complications due to a follow-up operation required to remove the hardware compared to plate and screw fixation. Regardless, there is no difference in long term range of motion between TBW and plating. Other postoperative complications include arthritis especially in comminuted fractures where the joint surface is disrupted, and stiffness which is more commonly seen in non-operative patients.

=== Coronoid process ===
Isolated fractures of the coronoid process of the elbow are caused by hyperextension of posterior (behind the elbow) forces. These posterior forces are either varus posteromedial or valgus posterolateral. The Mayo classification describes the location of the fracture line on the coronoid process:

- Type I: tip of the coronoid process
- Type II: 50% of the process
- Type III: >50% of the process

From type I to type III fractures were associated with higher rates of elbow dislocation and lower rates of satisfaction in return to function.

=== Terrible Triad ===
The terrible triad of the elbow (not to be confused with the terrible triad of the knee) is a combination of:

- A fracture of the head of radius
- A fracture of the coronoid process of the ulna
- Humeroulnar dislocation (generally posterior or posterolateral)

Treatment for the terrible triad involves treating all three components injured: the coronoid process and radial head with techniques previously described, and the ulnar collateral ligament which is usually injured in posterior elbow dislocation. Due to the severity and complexity of the terrible triad injury, postoperative complications are very high and include osteoarthritis, persistent instability, and stiffness.

== Pediatric elbow fractures ==
Due to the shape of the humerus bone – the most thin and weakest point are above the condyles, and children's tendency to break their falls with on outstretched arm locked in extension, supracondylar humerus fractures are the most common elbow fracture in children. Lateral condyle and medial epicondyle fractures (also known as "little league elbow") make up the next most common pediatric fractures.

=== Supracondylar humerus fractures ===
Supracondylar humerus fractures can be further divided into extension types and flexion types, which indicates the mechanism of injury. The extension type presents as the elbow being displaced posterior, or behind to the humerus and makes up approximately 95% of supracondylar humerus fractures. Complications of the extension type include anterior interosseus nerve and brachial artery injury. The flexion type, making up the other 5%, results in the elbow being displaced anterior to, or in front of, the humerus. Ulnar nerve palsies are seen in the flexion type injury. The degree of displacement of extension type supracondylar humerus fractures is characterized using the Gartland classification below:

- Type I: minimally or non-displaced fracture with both cortices of the humerus intact.
- Type II: anterior cortex is disrupted, but the posterior remains intact. Subtype IIA denotes a type II fracture with not rational instability, type IIB indicates rotational instability.
- Type III: complete displacement with both cortices disrupted.

Type I fractures are treated with a mid-shaft humeral cast and sling. Type IIB and III fractures require surgery with percutaneous pinning. Type IIA fractures are treated on a case-by-case basis depending mostly on the treating physician's judgement of a cast's ability to hold the fracture in place.

=== Lateral condyle fractures ===
Lateral condyle fractures occur when the outside eminence on the elbow end of the humeral bone chips off. They are the second most common type of pediatric elbow fractures and are characterized by the Milch classification. Lateral condyle fractures are treated surgically with and open reduction and Kirschner wires if the fracture fragment is displaced by 2 mm or the surface of the joint is affected by the fracture line. If neither of these characteristics are present, they can be treated without surgery with an above-elbow cast.

=== Medial epicondyle fracture ===
Medial epicondyle fractures are the third most common type of pediatric elbow fracture. They are a disruption of the medial epicondyle growth plate and occur from repeated valgus stress on the elbow in activities such as throwing a baseball. They are treated with rest from the offending sport or activity.
