= Supracondylar humerus fracture =

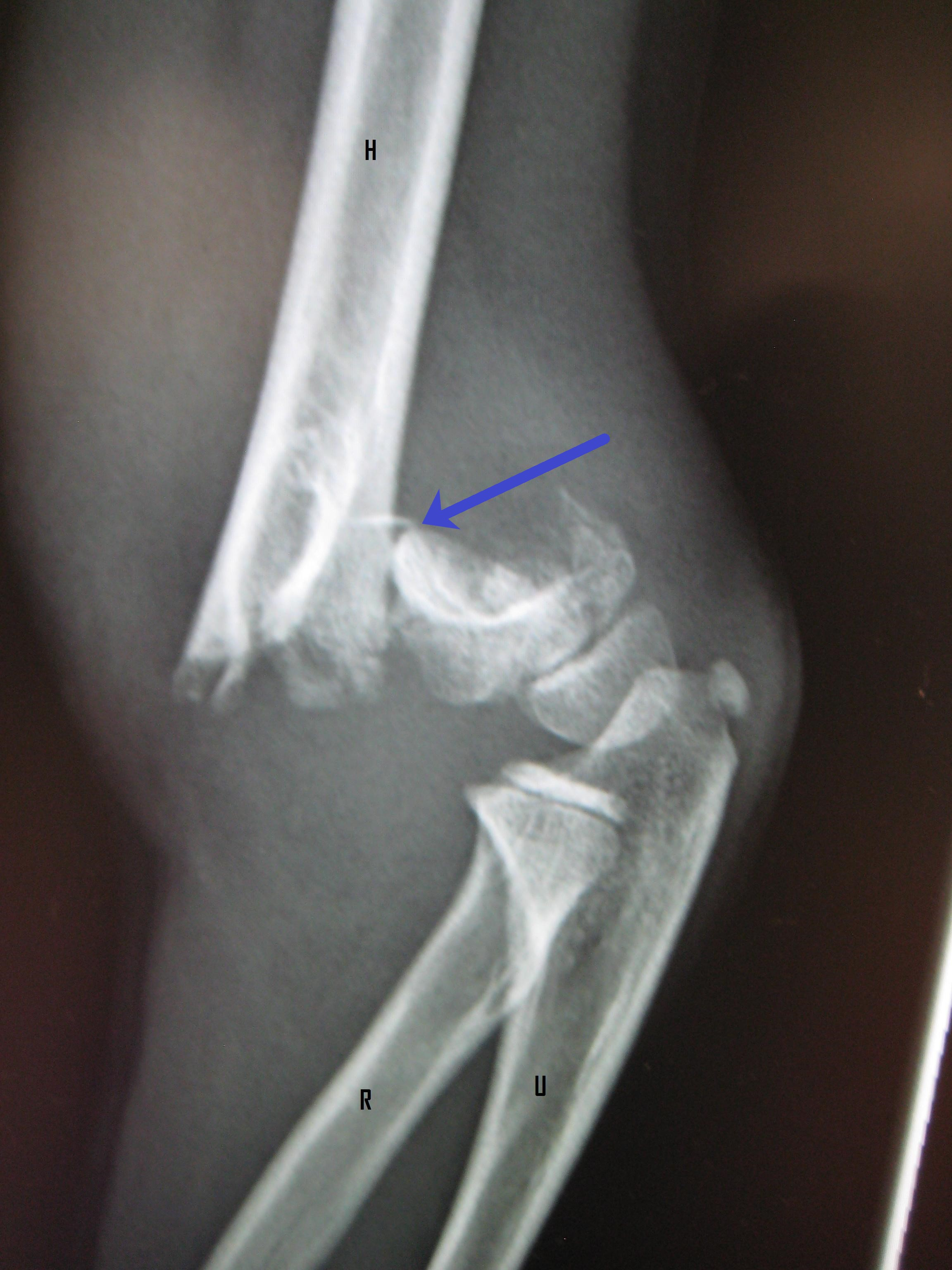
- An elbow X-ray showing a displaced supracondylar fracture in a young child
- Specialty: Orthopedic

A supracondylar humerus fracture is a fracture of the distal humerus just above the elbow joint. The fracture is usually transverse or oblique and above the medial and lateral condyles and epicondyles. This fracture pattern is relatively rare in adults, but is the most common type of elbow fracture in children. In children, many of these fractures are non-displaced and can be treated with casting. Some are angulated or displaced and are best treated with surgery. In children, most of these fractures can be treated effectively with expectation for full recovery. Some of these injuries can be complicated by poor healing or by associated blood vessel or nerve injuries with serious complications.

== Signs and symptoms ==
A child will complain of pain and swelling over the elbow immediately post trauma with loss of function of affected upper limb. Late onset of pain (hours after injury) could be due to muscle ischaemia (reduced oxygen supply). This can lead to loss of muscle function.

The fracture can disrupt the neurovascular status of the distal arm. Clinical parameters such as temperature of the limb extremities (warm or cold), capillary refilling time, oxygen saturation of the affected limb, presence of distal pulses (radial and ulnar pulses), assessment of peripheral nerves (radial, median, and ulnar nerves), and any wounds which would indicate open fracture. Doppler ultrasonography should be performed to ascertain blood flow of the affected limb if the distal pulses are not palpable. The anterior interosseous nerve is most often injured in postero-lateral displacement of the distal humerus as the proximal fragment is displaced antero-medially. This is evidenced by the weakness of the hand with a weak "OK" sign on physical examination; instead, a pincer grasp is performed. The radial nerve would be injured if the distal humerus is displaced postero-medially as the proximal fragment will be displaced antero-laterally. The ulnar nerve is most commonly injured in the flexion type of injury because it crosses the elbow below the medial epicondyle of the humerus.

A puckered, dimple, or an ecchymosis of the skin just anterior to the distal humerus is a sign of difficult reduction because the proximal fragment may have already penetrated the brachialis muscle and the subcutaneous layer of the skin.

=== Complications ===
==== Volkmann's contracture ====
Swelling and vascular injury following the fracture can lead to the development of compartment syndrome which leads to long-term complication of Volkmann's contracture (fixed flexion of the elbow, pronation of the forearm, flexion at the wrist, and joint extension of the metacarpophalangeal joint ). Therefore, early surgical reduction is indicated to prevent this type of complication.

==== Malunion ====
The distal humerus physis grows slowly (only contributes 20% of the longitudinal growth of the humerus). Errors in correction are common and may result in osteonecrosis, malunion and nonunion. Malunion can result in cubitus varus deformity.

== Mechanism ==
Extension type of supracondylar humerus fractures typically result from a fall on to an outstretched hand, usually leading to a forced hyperextension of the elbow. The olecranon acts as a fulcrum which focuses the stress on distal humerus (supracondylar area), predisposing the distal humerus to fracture. The supracondylar area undergoes remodeling at the age of 6 to 7, making this area thin and prone to fractures. Important arteries and nerves (median nerve, radial nerve, brachial artery, and ulnar nerve) are located at the supracondylar area and can give rise to complications if these structures are injured. Most vulnerable structure to get damaged is median nerve. Meanwhile, the flexion-type of supracondylar humerus fracture is less common. It occurs by falling on the point of the elbow, or falling with the arm twisted behind the back. This causes anterior dislocation of the proximal fragment of the humerus.

== Diagnosis ==
A supracondylar humerus fracture is diagnosed by X-ray and the injured limb will be examined to assess the surrounding soft tissue, neurovascular status, and to identify any other injuries to the affected area. Pain, swelling, and deformity near the elbow or arm area is common and a bleed near the fracture may result in an effusion in the elbow joint. With severe displacement, there may be an anterior dimple from the proximal bone end trapped within the biceps muscle. The skin is usually intact. If there is a laceration that communicates with the fracture site, it is an open fracture, which increases infection risk. For fractures with significant displacement, the bone end can be trapped within the biceps muscle with resulting tension producing an indentation to the skin, which is called a "pucker sign".

=== Vascular system examination ===
The vascular status must be assessed, including the warmth and perfusion of the hand, the time for capillary refill, and the presence of a palpable radial pulse. Limb vascular status is categorized as "normal," "pulseless with a (warm, pink) perfused hand," or "pulseless–pale (nonperfused)" (see "neurovascular complications" below).

=== Sensory and motor nerve examination ===
The neurologic status must be assessed including the sensory and motor function of the radial, ulnar, and median nerves (see "neurovascular complications" below). Neurologic deficits are found in 10-20% of patients. The most commonly injured nerve is the median nerve (specifically, the anterior interosseous portion of the median nerve). Injuries to the ulnar and radial nerves are less common.

=== X-rays ===
Diagnosis is confirmed by X-ray imaging. Antero-posterior (AP) and lateral view of the elbow joint should be obtained. Any other sites of pain, deformity, or tenderness should warrant an X-ray for that area too. X-ray of the forearm (AP and lateral) should also be obtained for because of the common association of supracondylar fractures with the fractures of the forearm. Ideally, splintage should be used to immobilise the elbow at 20 to 30 degrees flexion in order to prevent further injury of the blood vessels and nerves while doing X-rays. Splinting of fracture site with full flexion or extension of the elbow is not recommended as it can stretch the blood vessels and nerves over the bone fragments or can cause impingement of these structures into the fracture site.

Depending on the child's age, parts of the bone will still be developing and if not yet calcified, will not show up on the X-rays. The capitulum of the humerus is the first to ossify at the age of one year. Head of radius and medial epicondyle of the humerus starts to ossify at 4 to 5 years of age, followed by trochlea of humerus and olecranon of the ulna at 8 to 9 years of age, and lateral epicondyle of the humerus to ossify at 10 years of age.

==== Anterior X-ray ====
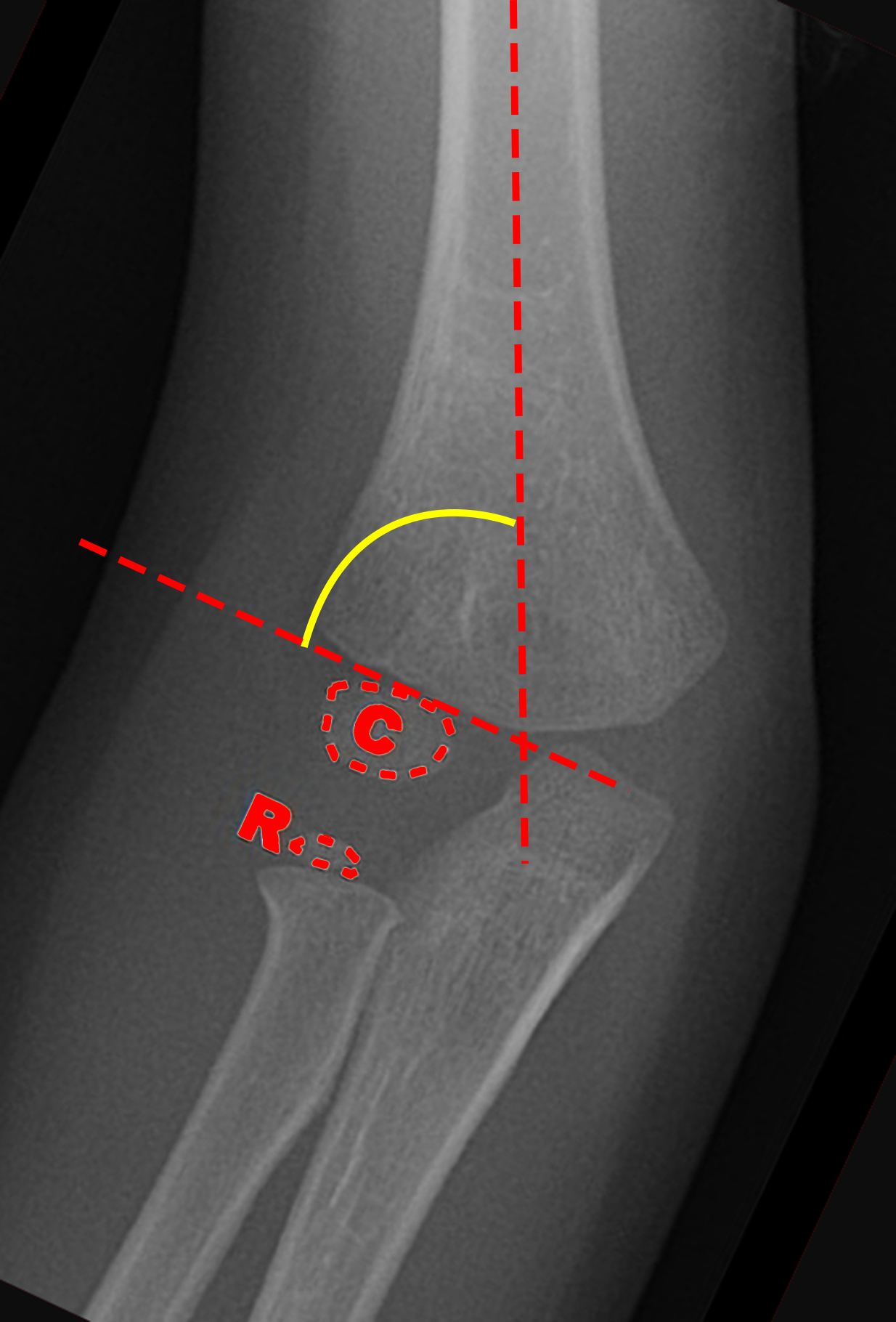
Baumann's Angle

Carrying angle can be evaluated through AP view of the elbow by looking at the Baumann's angle. There are two definitions of Bowmann's angle:

The first definition of Baumann's angle is an angle between a line parallel to the longitudinal axis of the humeral shaft and a line drawn along the lateral epicondyle.

Another definition of Baumann's angle is also known as the humeral-capitellar angle. It is the angle between the line perpendicular to the long axis of the humerus and the growth plate of the lateral condyle. Reported normal values for Baumann's angle range between 9 and 26°. An angle of more than 10° is regarded as acceptable.

==== Lateral X-ray ====
On lateral view of the elbow, there are five radiological features should be looked for: tear drop sign, anterior humeral line, coronoid line, fish-tail sign, and fat pad sign/sail sign (anterior and posterior).

Tear drop sign - Tear drop sign is seen on a normal radiograph, but is disturbed in supracondylar fracture.

Anterior humeral line - It is a line drawn down along the front of the humerus on the lateral view and it should pass through the middle third of the capitulum of the humerus. If it passes through the anterior third of the capitulum, it indicates the posterior displacement of distal fragment.

Fat pad sign/sail sign - A non-displaced fracture can be difficult to identify and a fracture line may not be visible on the X-rays. However, the presence of a joint effusion is helpful in identifying a non-displaced fracture. Bleeding from the fracture expands the joint capsule and is visualized on the lateral view as a darker area anteriorly and posteriorly, and is known as the sail sign.

Coronoid line - A line drawn along the anterior border of the coronoid process of the ulna should touch the anterior part of the lateral condyle of the humerus. If lateral condyle appears posterior to this line, it indicates the posterior displacement of lateral condyle.

Fish-tail sign - The distal fragment is rotated away from the proximal fragment, thus the sharp ends of the proximal fragment looks like a shape of a fish-tail.

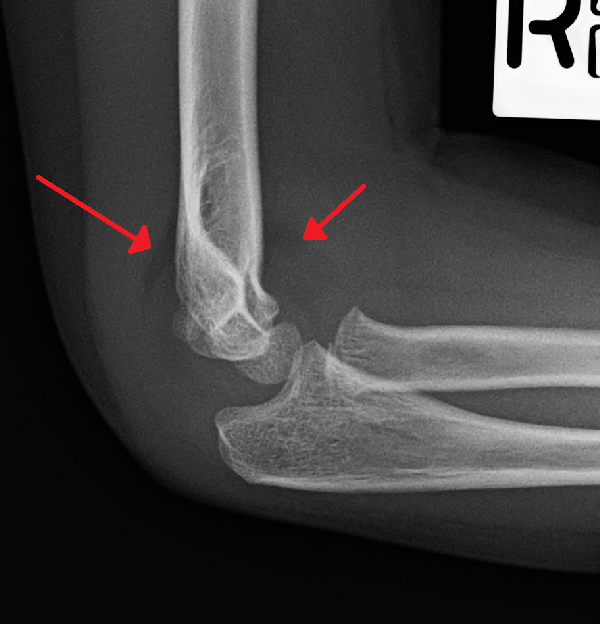
Anterior and posterior sail sign in a child who has a subtle supracondylar fracture

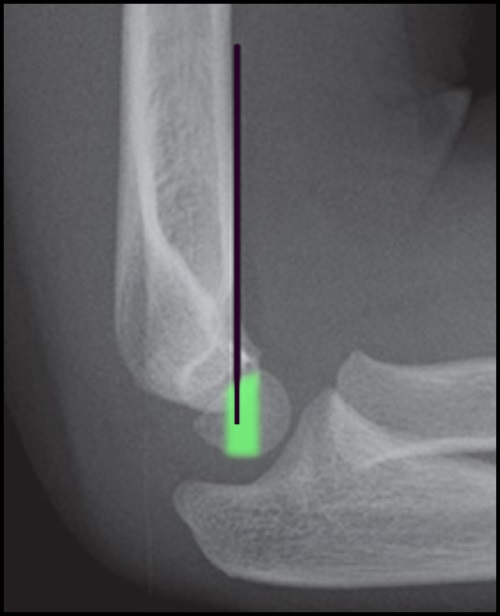
Anterior humeral line (black line), with normal area passed on the capitulum of the humerus colored in green in a 4-year-old child.

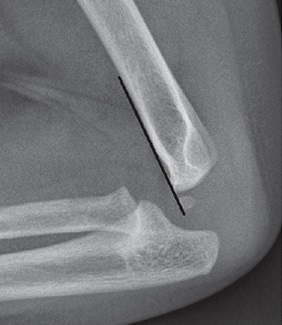
The anterior humeral line is not reliable in children with sparse ossification of the capitulum, such as in this 6 months old child.

=== Classification ===
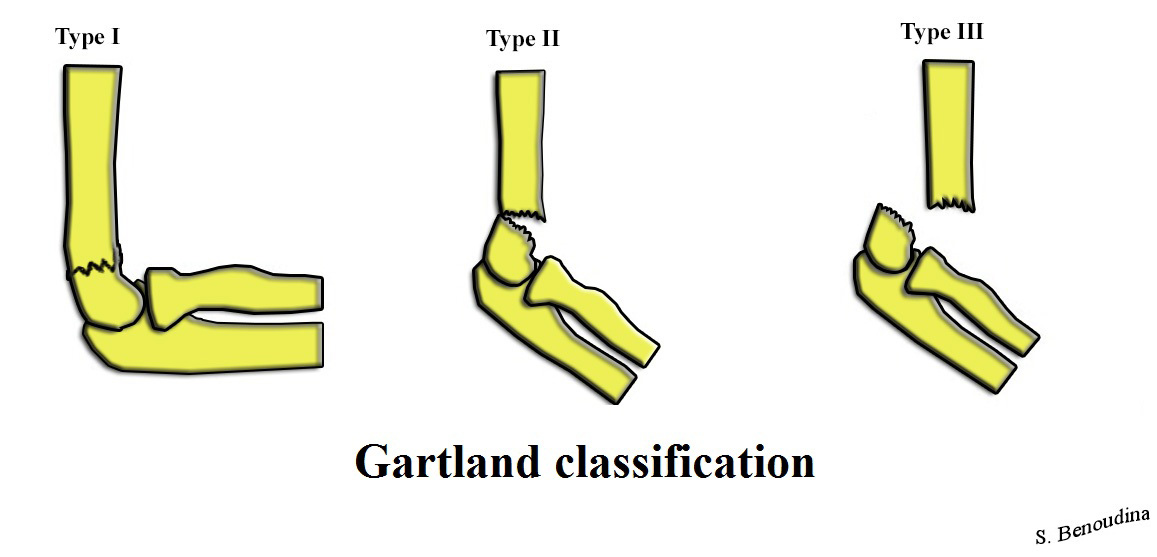
Supracondylar fractures: Gartland classification

Type	Description
I	Non-displaced
II	Angulated with intact posterior cortex
IIA	Angulation
IIB	Angulation with rotation
III	Complete displacement but have perisosteal (medial/lateral) contact
IIIA	Medial periosteal hinge intact. Distal fragment goes posteromedially
IIIB	Lateral periosteal hinge intact. Distal fragment goes posterolaterally
IV	Periostial disruption with instability in both flexion and extension

== Management ==
Treatment options for supracondylar humerus fractures vary depending if the bone is displaced (out of position) or not displaced (see classification section above).

=== Gartland type I ===
Undisplaced or minimally displaced fractures can be treated by using an above elbow splint in 90 degrees flexion for 3 weeks. Orthopaedic cast and extreme flexion should be avoided to prevent compartment syndrome and vascular compromise. In case the varus of the fracture site is more than 10 degrees when compared to the normal elbow, closed reduction and percutaneous pinning using X-ray image intensifier inside operating theater is recommended. In one study, for those children who was done percutaneous pinning, immobilisation using a posterior splint and an arm sling has earlier resumption of activity when compared to immobilisation using collar and cuff sling. Both methods gives similar pain scores and activity level at two weeks of treatment.

=== Gartland type II ===
Gartland Type II fractures requires closed reduction and casting at 90 degrees flexion. Percutaneous pinning is required if more than 90 degrees flexion is required to maintain the reduction. Closed reduction with percutaneous pinning has low complication rates. Closed reduction can be done by applying traction along the long axis of the humerus with elbow in slight flexion. Full extension of the elbow is not recommended because the neurovascular structures can hook around the proximal fragment of the humerus. If the proximal humerus is suspected to have pierced the brachialis muscle, gradual traction over the proximal humerus should be given instead. After that, reduction can be done through hyperflexion of the elbow can be done with the olecranon pushing anteriorly. If the distal fragment is internally rotated, reduction maneuver can be applied with extra stress applied over medial elbow with pronation of the forearm at the same time.

=== Gartland type III and IV ===
Gartland III and IV are unstable and prone to neurovascular injury. Therefore, closed or open reduction together with percutaneous pinning within 24 hours is the preferred method of management with low complication rates. Straight arm lateral traction can be a safe method to deal with Gartland Type III fractures. Although Gartland Type III fractures with posteromedial displacement of distal fragment can be reduced with closed reduction and casting, those with posterolateral displacement should preferably be fixed by percutaneous pinning.

=== Percutaneous pinning ===
Percutaneous pinning are usually inserted over the medial or lateral sides of the elbow under X-ray image intensifier guidance. There is 1.8 times higher risk of getting nerve injury when inserting both medial and lateral pins compared to lateral pin insertion alone. However, medial and lateral pins insertions are able to stabilise the fractures more properly than lateral pins alone. Therefore, medial and lateral pins insertion should be done with care to prevent nerve injuries around elbow region.

Percutaneous pinning should be done when close manipulation fails to achieve the reduction, unstable fracture after closed reduction, neurological deficits occurs during or after the manipulation of fracture, and surgical exploration is required to determine the integrity of the blood vessels and nerves. In open fractures, surgical wound debridement should be performed to prevent any infection into the elbow joint. All Type II and III fractures requiring elbow flexion of more than 90° to maintain the reduction needs to be fixed by percutaneous pinning. All Type IV fractures of supracondylar humerus are unstable; therefore, requires percutaneous pinning. Besides, any polytrauma with multiple fractures of the same side requiring surgical intervention is another indication for percutaneous pinning.

=== Follow up ===
For routine displaced supracondylar fractures requiring percutaneous pinning, radiographic evaluation and clinical assessment can be delayed until the pin removal. Pins are only removed when there is no tenderness over the elbow region at 3 to 4 weeks. After pin removal, mobilisation of the elbow can begin.

=== Neurovascular complications ===
Absence of radial pulse is reported in 6–20% of the supracondylar fracture cases. This is because brachial artery is frequently injured in Gartland Type II and Type III fractures, especially when the distal fragment is displaced postero-laterally (proximal fragment displaced antero-medially). The available evidence suggests that if the child has a median nerve palsy, their neurological recovery is faster, more complete and more probable if an open reduction and exploration of the nerve is performed. If the operating surgeons chooses to perform a closed reduction & percutaneous k-wiring in the presence of a neurological (and/or vascular) deficit and the pulse does not return immediately or the neurological deficit recover, then urgent surgical exploration is indicated. In patients with a "pink but pulseless hand" (absent radial pulse but demonstrable perfusion at extremities) after successful reduction and percutaneous pinning, there is uncertainty about the ideal management and imaging or surgical exploration should be considered given the risk of Volkmann's contracture.

== Epidemiology ==
Supracondylar humerus fractures is commonly found in children between 5 and 7 years (90% of the cases), after the clavicle and forearm fractures. It is more often occurs in males, accounting of 16% of all pediatric fractures and 60% of all paediatric elbow fractures. The mechanism of injury is most commonly due to fall on an outstretch hand. Extension type of injury (70% of all elbow fractures) is more common than the flexion type of injury (1% to 11% of all elbow injuries). Injury often occurs on the non-dominant part of the limb. Flexion type of injury is more commonly found in older children. Open fractures can occur for up to 30% of the cases.

== Bibliography ==
- De Pellegrin, M.; Fracassetti, D; Moharamzadeh, D; Origo, C; Catena, N (2018). "Advantages and disadvantages of the prone position in the surgical treatment of supracondylar humerus fractures in children. A literature review". Injury. 49: S37–S42. doi:10.1016/j.injury.2018.09.046. PMID 30286976. S2CID 52921491.
