= Ulnar collateral ligament of elbow joint =

Ligament on the elbow

Ulnar collateral ligament (elbow)
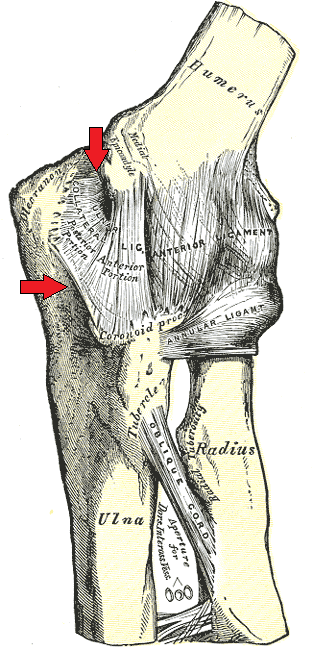
- Left elbow-joint, with arrows pointing at the ulnar collateral ligament

Details
- From: Medial epicondyle of the humerus
- To: Coronoid process of the ulna (anterior), olecranon (posterior)

Identifiers
- Latin: ligamentum collaterale ulnare
- MeSH: D000070637
- TA98: A03.5.09.005
- TA2: 1776
- FMA: 38869

The ulnar collateral ligament (UCL) or internal lateral ligament is a thick triangular ligament at the medial aspect of the elbow uniting the distal aspect of the humerus to the proximal aspect of the ulna.

== Structure ==
It consists of two portions, an anterior and posterior united by a thinner intermediate portion. Note that this ligament is also referred to as the medial collateral ligament and should not be confused with the lateral ulnar collateral ligament (LUCL).

The anterior portion, directed obliquely forward, is attached, above, by its apex, to the front part of the medial epicondyle of the humerus; and, below, by its broad base to the medial margin of the coronoid process of the ulna.

The posterior portion, also of triangular form, is attached, above, by its apex, to the lower and back part of the medial epicondyle; below, to the medial margin of the olecranon.

Between these two bands a few intermediate fibers descend from the medial epicondyle to blend with a transverse band which bridges across the notch between the olecranon and the coronoid process.

This ligament is in relation with the triceps brachii and flexor carpi ulnaris and the ulnar nerve, and gives origin to part of the flexor digitorum superficialis.

== Injury ==
During activities such as overhand baseball pitching, this ligament is subjected to extreme tension, which places the overhand-throwing athlete at risk for injury. Acute or chronic disruption and/or attenuation of the ulnar collateral ligament often result in medial elbow pain, valgus instability, and impaired throwing performance. There are both non-surgical and surgical treatment options.

== Additional images ==
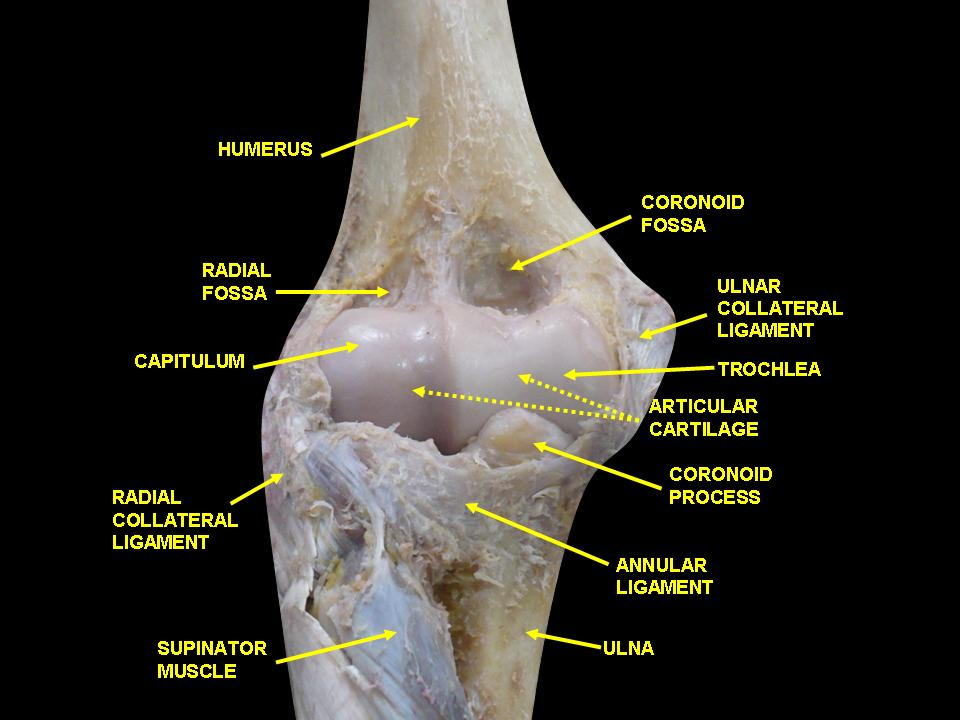
Elbow joint. Deep dissection. Anterior view.

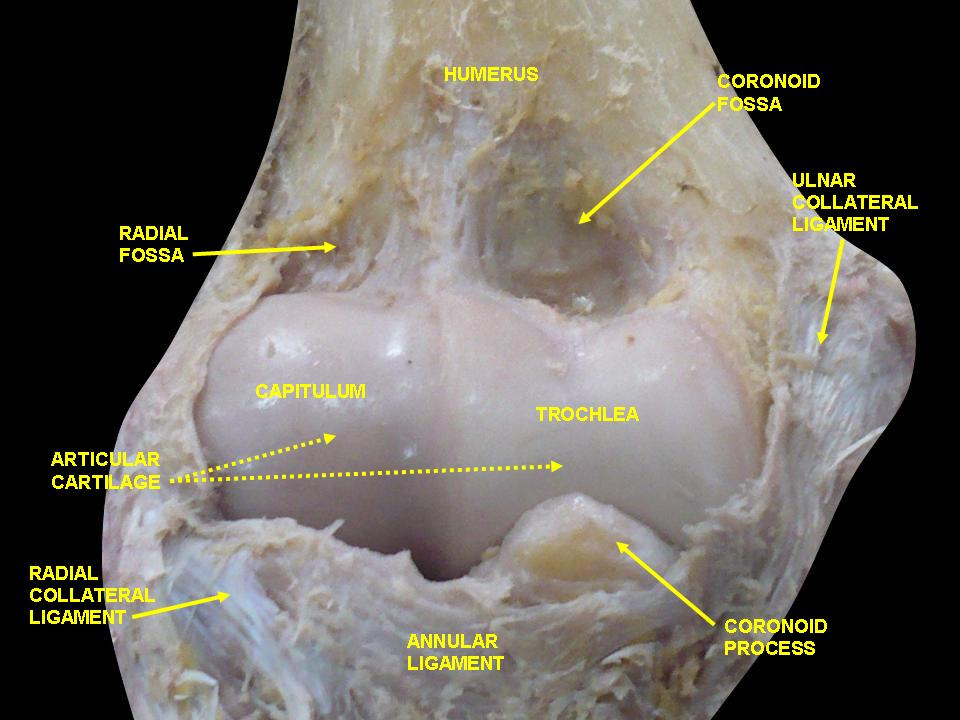
Elbow joint. Deep dissection. Anterior view.

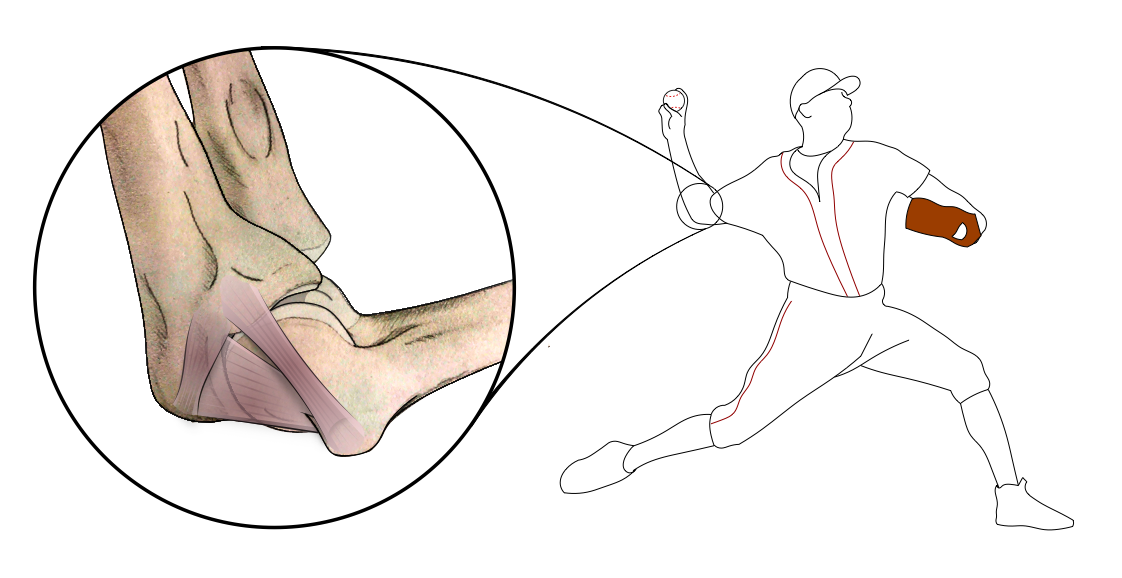
Anatomy of the ulnar collateral ligament in the pitcher's elbow

== See also ==
- Tommy John surgery
