= Mark L. Mason =

Orthopedic surgeon

- Born: 24 October 1915
- Died: 29 January 1972
- Education: St Bartholomew's Hospital, London
- Known for: Classification of radial head fractures
- Medical career
- Profession: Surgeon
- Field: Orthopaedics
- Institutions: St Bartholomew's Hospital, London; Royal Victoria Hospital, Bournemouth; West London Hospital, Hammersmith; Queen Elizabeth Hospital for Children; Whipps Cross Hospital; Connaught Hospital; Chingford hospital
- Research: Elbow fractures

Mark Leon Mason (24 October 1915 – 29 January 1972) FRCSE was a British orthopaedic surgeon. In 1954 he gave the first detailed classification of radial head fractures.

During his service during the Second World War in the Royal Air Force, Mason organised surgical teams in North Africa and Burma, where he acquired experience in trauma surgery from battlefield injuries. He later took up surgical posts at the Royal Victoria Hospital, Bournemouth, the West London Hospital, Hammersmith, and the Queen Elizabeth Hospital for Children. After obtaining a fellowship from the Royal College of Surgeons of Edinburgh he worked in orthopaedics in South East Kent.

== Early life and education ==
Mark Mason was born on 24 October 1915. He obtained the conjoint diploma from St Bartholomew's Hospital in 1939.

== Career ==
In April 1941, during his service in the Royal Air Force in the Second World War, Mason organised surgical teams in North Africa and Burma, where he acquired experience in trauma surgery from battlefield injuries. Following his time in the service, he rose to the rank of squadron leader and took on an appointment of orthopaedic registrar at the Royal Victoria Hospital, Bournemouth. He held posts as a registrar and senior registrar at the West London Hospital, Hammersmith, and in the orthopaedic department of the Queen Elizabeth Hospital for Children. In 1949, he obtained a fellowship from the Royal College of Surgeons of Edinburgh and subsequently became a senior registrar in orthopaedics in South East Kent, working at hospitals in Canterbury and the Isle of Thanet. In November 1956, he was appointed as an orthopaedic surgeon for the Forest Group of Hospitals. Within that group, he held positions at Whipps Cross Hospital, the Connaught Hospital, and Chingford hospital.

=== Elbow fractures ===
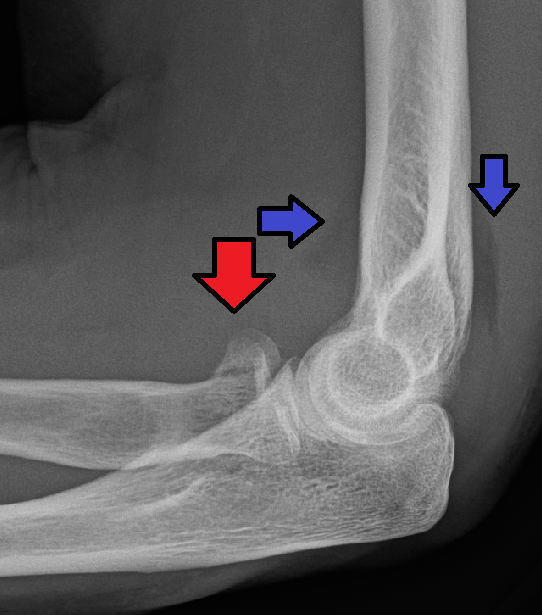
Displaced fracture of the radial head with anterior and posterior fat pad signs.

In 1954, Mason introduced the first detailed classification system for radial head fractures, categorizing them into three distinct types of elbow fracture. His grouping was based on a review of 100 consecutive cases and their treatments, which he documented in a landmark paper titled "Some Observations on Fractures of the Head of the Radius with a Review of One Hundred Cases". This classification system was later modified by G. W. Johnston and Robert N. Hotchkiss.

== Death ==
Mason died at the age of 56 on 29 January 1972, and was survived by his wife and three children.

== Selected publications ==
- Mason, Mark L. (1 January 1953). "Colles's fracture a survey of end-results". British Journal of Surgery. 40 (162): 340–346. doi:10.1002/bjs.18004016208. ISSN 0007-1323. PMID 13019085.
- Mason, Mark L. (1 September 1954). "Some observations on fractures of the head of the radius with a review of one hundred cases". British Journal of Surgery. 42 (172): 123–132. doi:10.1002/bjs.18004217203. ISSN 0007-1323. PMID 13209035.
- Mason, Mark L. (1954). "The Management of Colles's Fractures". International Journal of Clinical Practice. 8 (12): 837–842. doi:10.1111/j.1742-1241.1954.tb00431.x. ISSN 1742-1241.
