= Stress fracture =

Bone fracture due to repeated stressing

- Other names: Hairline fracture, fissure fracture, march fracture, spontaneous fracture, fatigue fracture
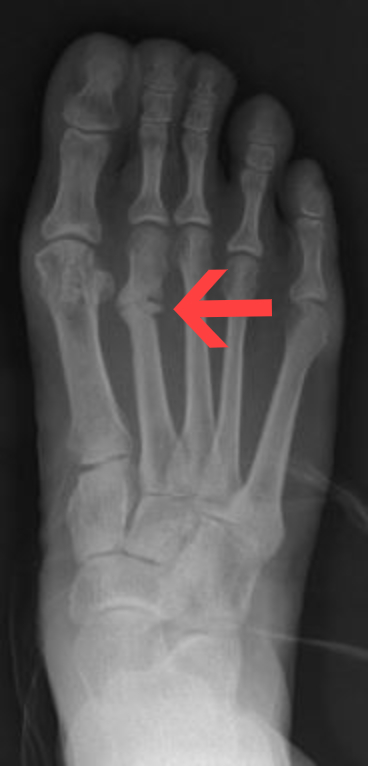
- Stress fracture of the second metatarsal bone (below the knuckles of the second toe)
- Specialty: Orthopedics

A stress fracture is a fatigue-induced bone fracture caused by repeated stress over time. Instead of resulting from a single severe impact, stress fractures are the result of accumulated injury from repeated submaximal loading, such as running or jumping. Because of this mechanism, stress fractures are common overuse injuries in athletes.

Stress fractures can be described as small cracks in the bone, or hairline fractures. Stress fractures of the foot are sometimes called "march fractures" because of the injury's prevalence among heavily marching soldiers. Stress fractures most frequently occur in weight-bearing bones of the lower extremities, such as the tibia and fibula (bones of the lower leg), calcaneus (heel bone), metatarsal and navicular bones (bones of the foot). Less common are stress fractures to the femur, pelvis, sacrum, lumbar spine (lower back), hips, hands, and wrists. Stress fractures make up about 20% of overall sports injuries. Treatment usually consists of rest followed by a gradual return to exercise over a period of months.

== Signs and symptoms ==
Stress fractures are typically discovered after a rapid increase in exercise. Symptoms usually have a gradual onset, with complaints that include isolated pain along the shaft of the bone and during activity, decreased muscular strength and cramping. In cases of fibular stress fractures, pain occurs proximal to the lateral malleolus, that increases with activity and subsides with rest. If pain is constantly present it may indicate a more serious bone injury. There is usually an area of localized tenderness on or near the bone and generalized swelling in the area. Pressure applied to the bone may reproduce symptoms and reveal crepitus in well-developed stress fractures. Anterior tibial stress fractures elicit focal tenderness on the anterior tibial crest, while posterior medial stress fractures can be tender at the posterior tibial border.

== Causes ==
Bones are constantly attempting to remodel and repair themselves, especially during a sport where extraordinary stress is applied to the bone. Over time, if enough stress is placed on the bone that it exhausts the capacity of the bone to remodel, a weakened site—a stress fracture—may appear on the bone. The fracture does not appear suddenly. It occurs from repeated traumas, none of which is sufficient to cause a sudden break, but which, when added together, overwhelm the osteoblasts that remodel the bone.

Potential causes include overload caused by muscle contraction, amenorrhea, an altered stress distribution in the bone accompanying muscle fatigue, a change in ground reaction force (concrete to grass) or the performance of a rhythmically repetitive stress that leads up to a vibratory summation point.

Stress fractures commonly occur in sedentary people who suddenly undertake a burst of exercise (whose bones are not used to the task). They may also occur in athletes completing high volume, high impact training, such as running or jumping sports. Stress fractures are also commonly reported in soldiers who march long distances.

Muscle fatigue can play a role in the occurrence of stress fractures. The neuromuscular hypothesis is the leading theoretical framework on muscle fatigue's role in stress fractures. In a runner, each stride normally exerts large forces at various points in the legs. Each shock—a rapid acceleration and energy transfer—must be absorbed. Muscles and bones serve as shock absorbers. However, the muscles, usually those in the lower leg, become fatigued after running a long distance and lose their ability to absorb shock. As the bones now experience larger stresses, this increases the risk of fracture. Experimental evidence remains mixed, with some studies done on competitive distance runners concluding that shock absorption does not change after brief exhaustive running.

Previous stress fractures have been identified as a risk factor. Along with history of stress fractures, a narrow tibial shaft, high degree of hip external rotation, osteopenia, osteoporosis, and pes cavus are common predisposing factors for stress fractures.

Common causes in sport that result in stress fractures include:

- Over training
- Going back to competition too soon after an injury or illness
- Going from one event to another without proper training for the second event
- Starting initial training too quickly
- Changing habits or the environment like training surface or shoes

== Diagnosis ==
X-rays usually do not show evidence of new stress fractures, but can be used approximately three weeks after onset of pain when the bone begins to remodel. A CT scan, MRI, or 3-phase bone scan may be more effective for early diagnosis.

MRI appears to be the most accurate diagnostic test.

Tuning forks have been advocated as an inexpensive alternative for identifying the presence of stress fractures. The clinician places a vibrating tuning fork along the shaft of the suspected bone. If a stress fracture is present, the vibration would cause pain. This test has a low positive likelihood ratio and a high negative likelihood ratio, meaning that it produces both false positive diagnoses and false negative diagnoses, so it should not be used as the only diagnostic method.

== Prevention ==
Altering the biomechanics of training and training schedules may reduce the prevalence of stress fractures. Orthotic insoles have been found to decrease the rate of stress fractures in military recruits, but it is unclear whether this can be extrapolated to the general population or athletes. On the other hand, some athletes have argued that cushioning in shoes actually causes more stress by reducing the body's natural shock-absorbing action, thus increasing the frequency of running injuries. During exercise that applies more stress to the bones, it may help to increase daily calcium (2,000 mg) and vitamin D (800 IU) intake, depending on the individual.

== Treatment ==
For low-risk stress fractures, rest is the best management option. The amount of recovery time varies greatly depending upon the location and severity of the fracture, and the body's healing response. Complete rest and a stirrup leg brace or walking boot are usually used for a period of four to eight weeks, although periods of rest of twelve weeks or more are not uncommon for more-severe stress fractures. After this period, activities may be gradually resumed as long as the activities do not cause pain. While the bone may feel healed and not hurt during daily activity, the process of bone remodeling may take place for many months after the injury feels healed. Instances of refracturing the bone are still a significant risk. Activities such as running or sports that place additional stress on the bone should only gradually be resumed. Rehabilitation usually includes muscle strength training to help dissipate the forces transmitted to the bones.

With severe stress fractures (see "prognosis"), surgery may be needed for proper healing. The procedure may involve pinning the fracture site, and rehabilitation can take up to six months.

== Prognosis ==
Anterior tibial stress fractures can have a particularly poor prognosis and can require surgery. On radiographic imaging, these stress fractures are referred to as the "dreaded black line." When compared to other stress fractures, anterior tibial fractures are more likely to progress to complete fracture of the tibia and displacement. Superior femoral neck stress fractures, if left untreated, can progress to become complete fractures with avascular necrosis, and should also be managed surgically. Proximal metadiaphyseal fractures of the fifth metatarsal (middle of the outside edge of the foot) are also notorious for poor bone healing. These stress fractures heal slowly with significant risk of refracture.

== Epidemiology ==
In the United States, the annual incidence of stress fractures in athletes and military recruits ranges from 5% to 30%, depending on the sport and other risk factors. Women and highly active individuals are also at a higher risk. The incidence probably also increases with age due to age-related reductions in bone mass density (BMD). Children may also be at risk because their bones have yet to reach full density and strength. The female athlete triad also can put women at risk as disordered eating and osteoporosis can cause the bones to be severely weakened.

This type of injury is mostly seen in lower extremities, due to the constant weight-bearing (WB). The bones commonly affected by stress fractures are the tibia, tarsals, metatarsals (MT), fibula, femur, pelvis and spine. Upper extremity stress fractures occur less frequently and are usually created in the upper torso by muscle forces.

The population that has the highest risk for stress fractures is athletes and military recruits who are participating in repetitive, high intensity training. Sports and activities that have excessive, repetitive ground reaction forces have the highest incidence of stress fractures. The site at which the stress fracture occurs depends on the activity/sports that the individual participates in.

Women are more at risk for stress fractures than men due to factors such as lower aerobic capacity, reduced muscle mass, lower bone mineral density, among other anatomical and hormone-related elements. Women also have a two- to four-times increased risk of stress fractures when they have amenorrhea compared to women who are eumenorrheic. Reduced bone health increases the risk of stress fractures and studies have shown an inverse relationship between bone mineral density and stress fracture occurrences. This condition is most notable and commonly seen on the femoral neck.

== Other animals ==
=== Dinosaurs ===
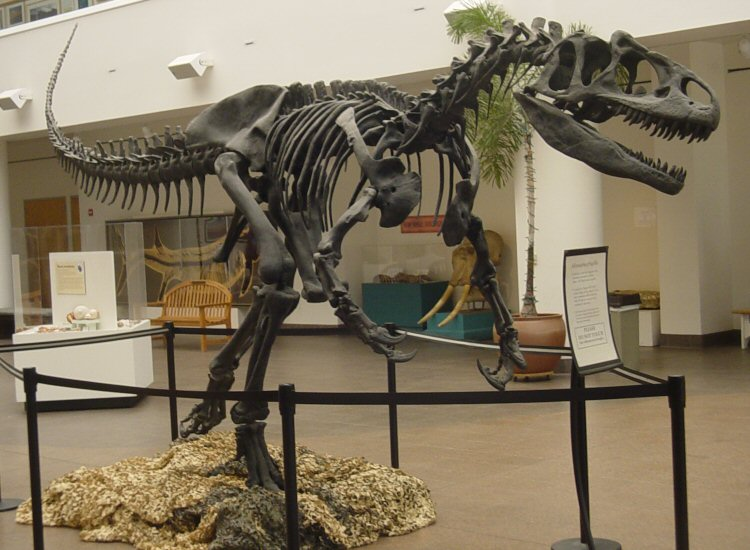
Allosaurus fragilis was found to have the most stress fractures of any dinosaur examined in a 2001 study.

In 2001, Bruce Rothschild and other paleontologists published a study examining evidence for stress fractures in theropod dinosaurs and analyzed the implications such injuries would have for reconstructing their behavior. Since stress fractures are due to repeated events they are probably caused by expressions of regular behavior rather than chance trauma. The researchers paid special attention to evidence of injuries to the hand since dinosaurs' hind feet would be more prone to injuries received while running or migrating. Hand injuries, meanwhile, were more likely to be caused by struggling prey. Stress fractures in dinosaur bones can be identified by looking for bulges on the shafts of bones that face toward the front of the animal. When X-rayed, these bulges often show lines of clear space where the X-rays have a harder time traveling through the bone. Rothschild and the other researchers noted that this "zone of attenuation" seen under the X-ray typically cannot be seen with the naked eye.

The researchers described theropod phalanges as being "pathognomonic" for stress fractures; this means they are "characteristic and unequivocal diagnostically”. Rothschild and the other researchers examined and dismissed other kinds of injury and sickness as causes of the lesions they found on the dinosaurs' bones. Lesions left by stress fractures can be distinguished from osteomyelitis without difficulty because of a lack of bone destruction in stress fracture lesions. They can be distinguished from benign bone tumors like osteoid osteoma by the lack of a sclerotic perimeter. No disturbance of the internal bony architecture of the sort caused by malignant bone tumors was encountered among the stress fracture candidates. No evidence of metabolic disorders like hyperparathyroidism or hyperthyroidism was found in the specimens, either.

After examining the bones of many kinds of dinosaur the researchers noted that Allosaurus had a significantly greater number of bulges on the shafts of its hand and foot bones than the tyrannosaur Albertosaurus, or the ostrich dinosaurs Ornithomimus and Archaeornithomimus. Most of the stress fractures observed along the lengths of Allosaurus toe bones were confined to the ends closest to the hind foot, but were spread across all three major digits in "statistically indistinguishable" numbers. Since the lower end of the third metatarsal would have contacted the ground first while a theropod was running it would have borne the most stress and should be most predisposed to develop stress fractures. The lack of such a bias in the examined fossils indicates an origin for the stress fractures from a source other than running. The authors conclude that these fractures occurred during interaction with prey. They suggest that such injuries could occur as a result of the theropod trying to hold struggling prey with its feet. The presence of stress fractures provide evidence for very active predation-based feeding rather than scavenging diets.
