= Robert N. Hotchkiss =

- Medical career
- Field: Orthopaedics
- Institutions: Hospital for Special Surgery
- Research: Elbow injuries Hand surgery

Robert N. Hotchkiss is an American orthopaedic surgeon who modified Mark L. Mason's classification of radial head fractures, known as the Mason-Hotchkiss classification, and is also named after the Hotchkiss surgical 'over the top approach' to visualise the radial head in the elbow.

== Selected publications ==
- Hotchkiss, Robert N. (January 1997). "Displaced Fractures of the Radial Head: Internal Fixation or Excision?". The Journal of the American Academy of Orthopaedic Surgeons. 5 (1): 1–10. doi:10.5435/00124635-199701000-00001. ISSN 1940-5480. PMID 10797202. (Co-author)
- Hurst, Lawrence C.; Badalamente, Marie A.; Hentz, Vincent R.; Hotchkiss, Robert N.; Kaplan, F. Thomas D.; Meals, Roy A.; Smith, Theodore M.; Rodzvilla, John; CORD I Study Group (3 September 2009). "Injectable collagenase clostridium histolyticum for Dupuytren's contracture". The New England Journal of Medicine. 361 (10): 968–979. doi:10.1056/NEJMoa0810866. ISSN 1533-4406. PMID 19726771. (Co-author)
