= Tuberosity of the ulna =

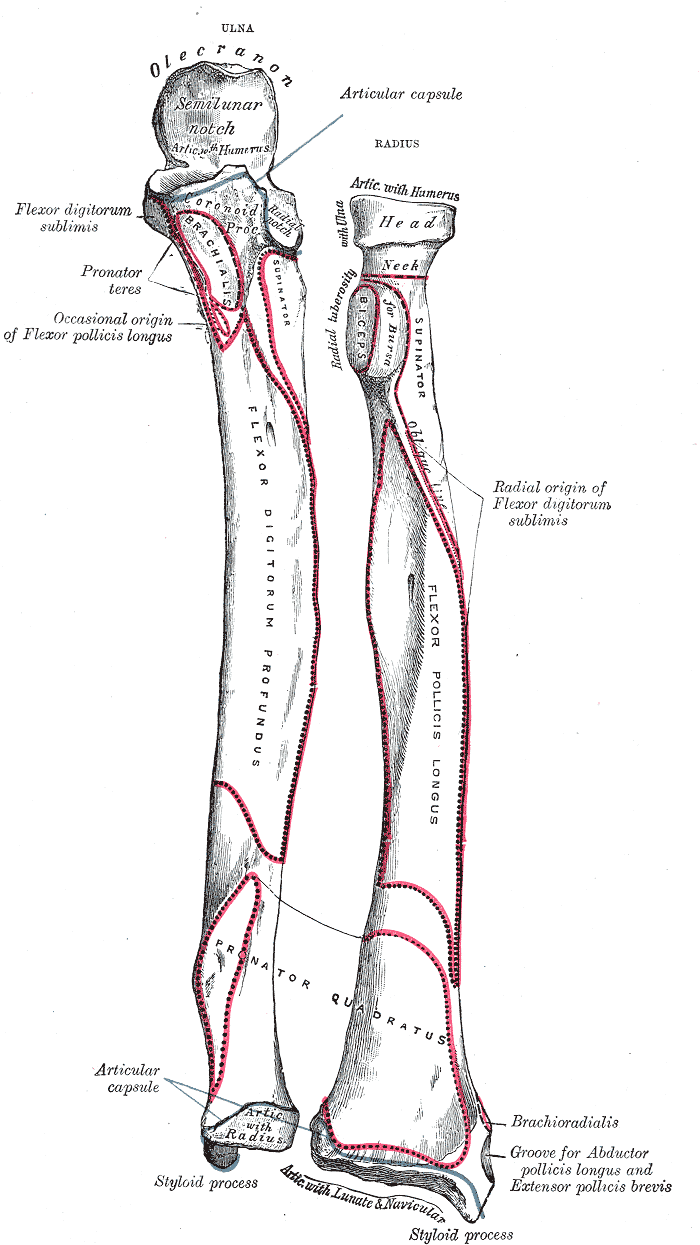
- Bones of left forearm. Anterior aspect.

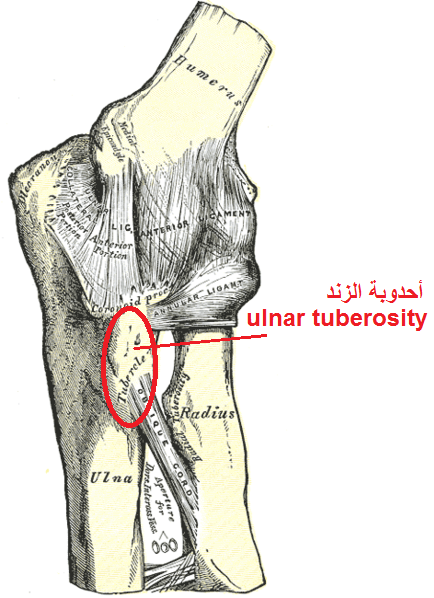
- Tuberosity of the ulna.

Details

Identifiers
- Latin: tuberositas ulnae
- TA98: A02.4.06.004
- TA2: 1233
- FMA: 23617

The tuberosity of the ulna is a rough eminence on the proximal end of the ulna. It occurs at the junction of the antero-inferior surface of the coronoid process with the front of the body. It provides an insertion point to a tendon of the brachialis (the oblique cord of the brachialis is attached to the lateral border).

== Additional images ==
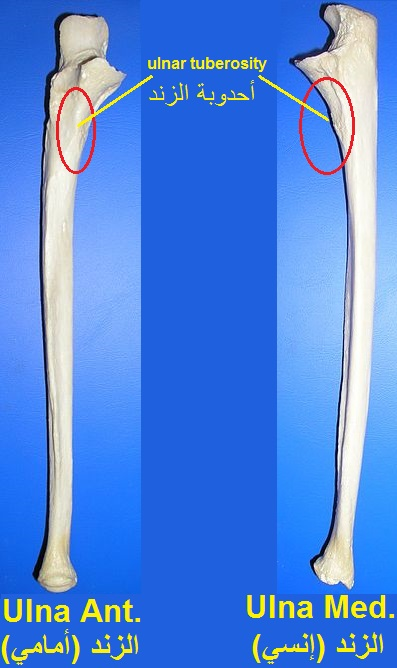
Tuberosity of the ulna.

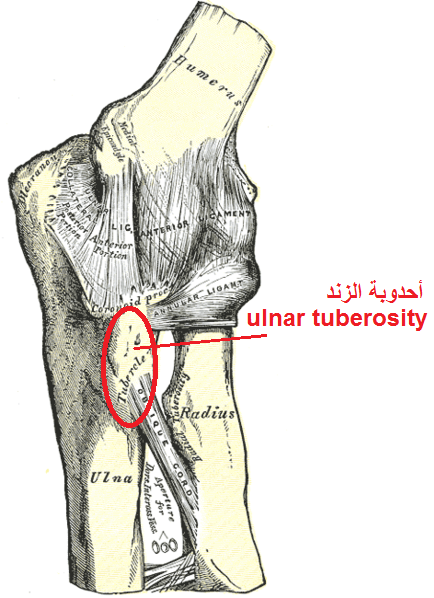
Tuberosity of the ulna.

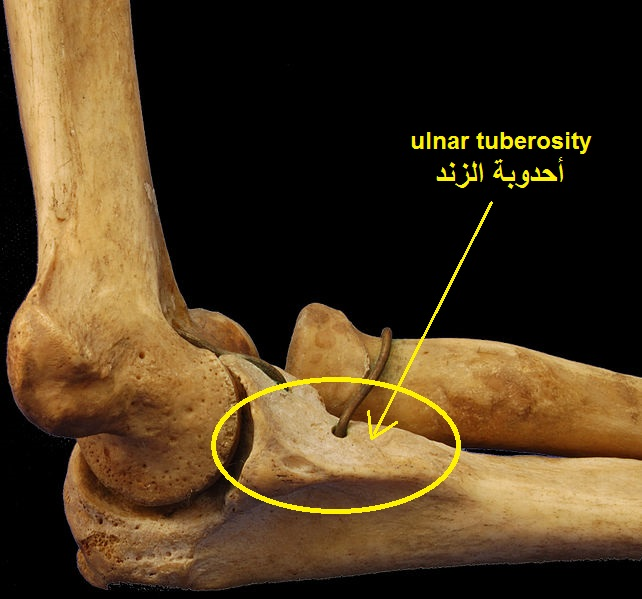
Tuberosity of the ulna.
