= George Weir Johnston =

George Weir Johnston was a British surgeon, who is named in a classification of radial head fractures, after modifying the one created by Mark L. Mason. He was also known for importing stapling guns from Russia for the purpose of fixing oesophageal varices.

== Selected publications ==
- Johnston GW. (1962) "A follow-up of one hundred cases of fracture of the head of the radius with a review of the literature." Ulster Med J 31:51–56.
