= Gartland classification =

Categorization of humerus fractures

The Gartland classification is a system of categorizing supracondylar humerus fractures, clinically useful as it predicts the likelihood of associated neurovascular injury, such as anterior interosseous nerve neurapraxia or brachial artery disruption.

== Classification ==
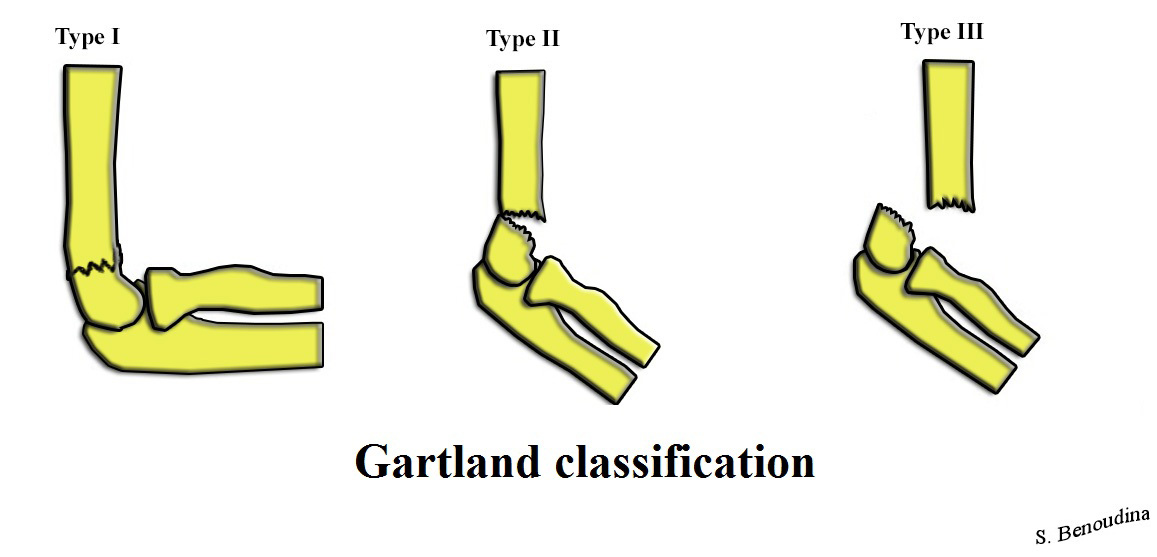
Supracondylar fractures: Gartland classification

Type³	Description
I	Non-displaced
II	Angulated with intact posterior cortex
IIA	Angulation
IIB	Angulation with rotation
III	Complete displacement but have perisosteal (medial/lateral) contact
IIIA	Medial periosteal hinge intact. Distal fragment goes posteromedially
IIIB	Lateral periosteal hinge intact. Distal fragment goes posterolaterally
IV	Periostial disruption with instability in both flexion and extension
