= Brachialis muscle =

Flexor muscle in the upper arm

Brachialis
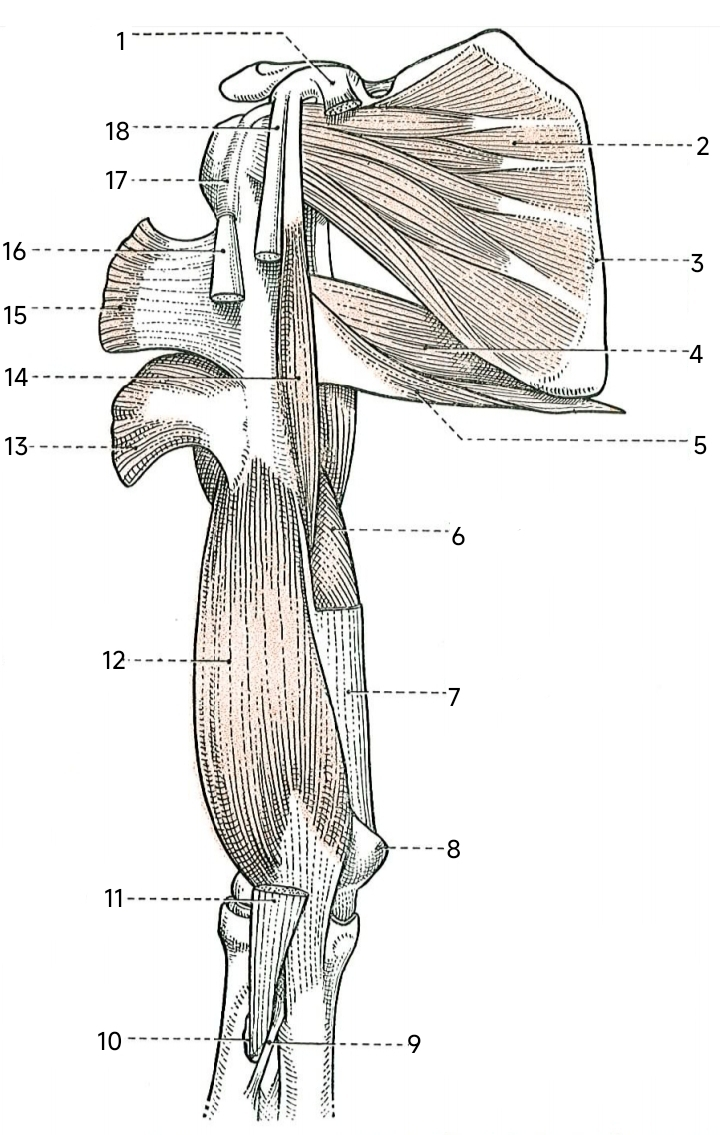
- Muscles of the anterior compartment of upper arm, deep layer; subscapularis and teres major muscles also shown. Right upper limb. Anterior view. 1, Pectoralis minor tendon — 2, Subscapularis — 3, Origin footprint of serratus magnus — 4, Teres major — 5, Latissimus — 6, Triceps — 7, Medial intermuscular septum — 8, Medial epicondyle — 9, Oblique cord — 10, Bicipital tuberosity — 11, Biceps tendon — 12, Brachialis — 13, Deltoid — 14, Coracobrachialis — 15, Pectoralis major — 16, Long head of biceps — 17, Brodie's ligament — 18, Short head of biceps. (After Charpy.)

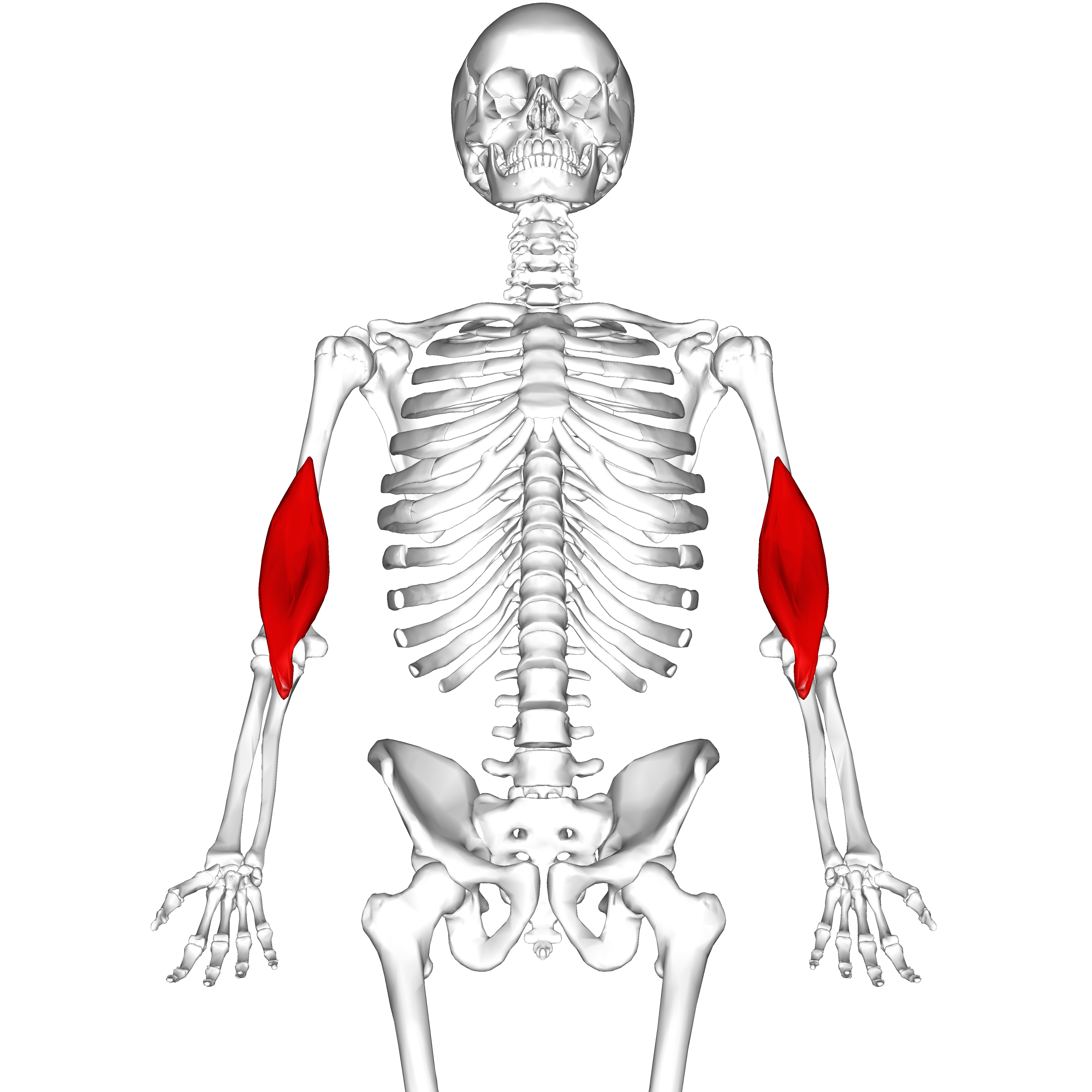
- Position of brachialis (shown in red).

Details
- Origin: Anterior surface of the humerus, particularly the distal half of this bone
- Insertion: Coronoid process and the tuberosity of the ulna
- Artery: Radial recurrent artery, brachial artery
- Nerve: Musculocutaneous nerve (C5-C7) and radial nerve (C5, C6)
- Actions: Flexion at elbow joint

Identifiers
- Latin: musculus brachialis
- TA98: A04.6.02.018
- TA2: 2469
- FMA: 37667

The brachialis (also brachialis anticus or Casserio muscle) is a muscle in the upper arm that flexes the elbow. It lies beneath the biceps brachii, and makes up part of the floor of the region known as the cubital fossa (elbow pit). It originates from the anterior aspect of the distal humerus; it inserts onto the tuberosity of the ulna. It is innervated by the musculocutaneous nerve, and commonly also receives additional innervation from the radial nerve. The brachialis is the prime mover of elbow flexion generating about 50% more power than the biceps.

== Structure ==
=== Origin ===
The brachialis originates from the anterior surface of the distal half of the humerus, near the insertion of the deltoid muscle, which it embraces by two angular processes. Its origin extends below to within 2.5 cm of the margin of the articular surface of the humerus at the elbow joint.

=== Insertion ===
Its fibers converge to a thick tendon which is inserted into the tuberosity of the ulna, and the rough depression on the anterior surface of the coronoid process of the ulna.

=== Innervation ===
The brachialis muscle is innervated by the musculocutaneous nerve (also Casserio nerve), which runs on its superficial surface, between it and the biceps brachii. However, in 70-80% of people, the muscle has double innervation with the radial nerve (C5-T1). The divide between the two innervations is at the insertion of the deltoid.

=== Blood supply ===
The brachialis is supplied by muscular branches of the brachial artery and by the recurrent radial artery.

=== Variation ===
The muscle is occasionally doubled; additional muscle slips to the supinator, pronator teres, biceps brachii, lacertus fibrosus, or radius are more rarely found.

== Function ==
The brachialis flexes the arm at the elbow joint. It shares this function with the biceps brachii and the brachioradialis, with the brachialis being the most powerful flexor of the forearm. Unlike the biceps, the brachialis does not insert on the radius, and does not participate in pronation and supination of the forearm.

== History ==
=== Etymology ===
The brachialis muscle and brachial muscle can be considered as the anglicized variant of the Latin expression musculus bracchialis. In classical Latin bracchialis means of or belonging to the arm, and is derived from classical Latin bracchium,"arm". The expression musculus brachialis is used in the current official anatomic nomenclature Terminologia Anatomica.

== Additional images ==
Position of brachialis (shown in red). Animation.

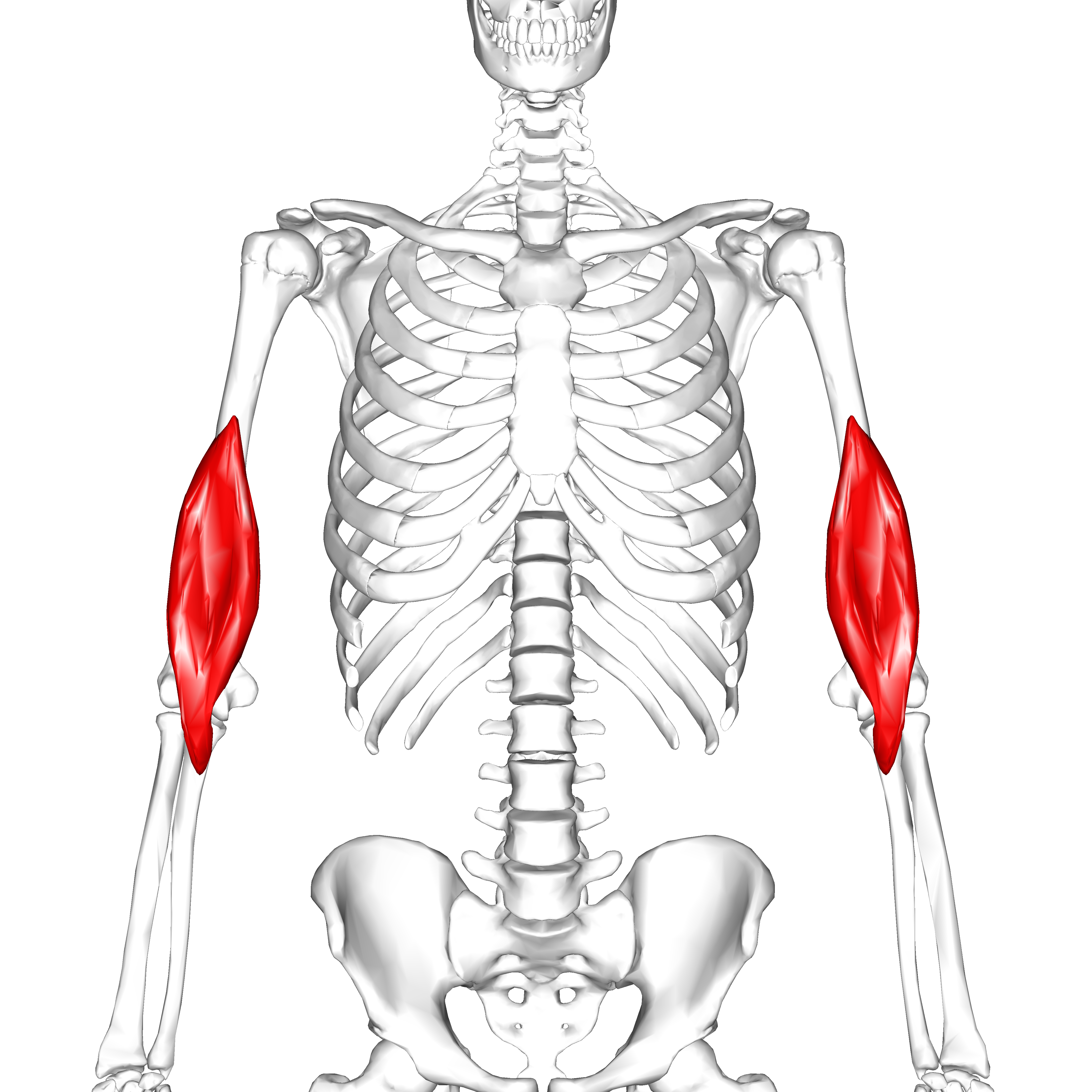
Still image.

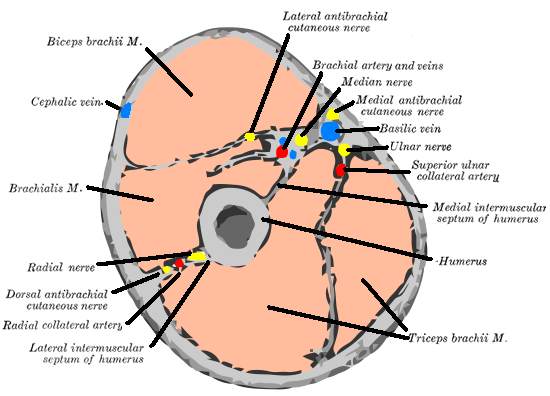
Horizontal section through the middle of upper arm. (Brachialis labeled at center left.)

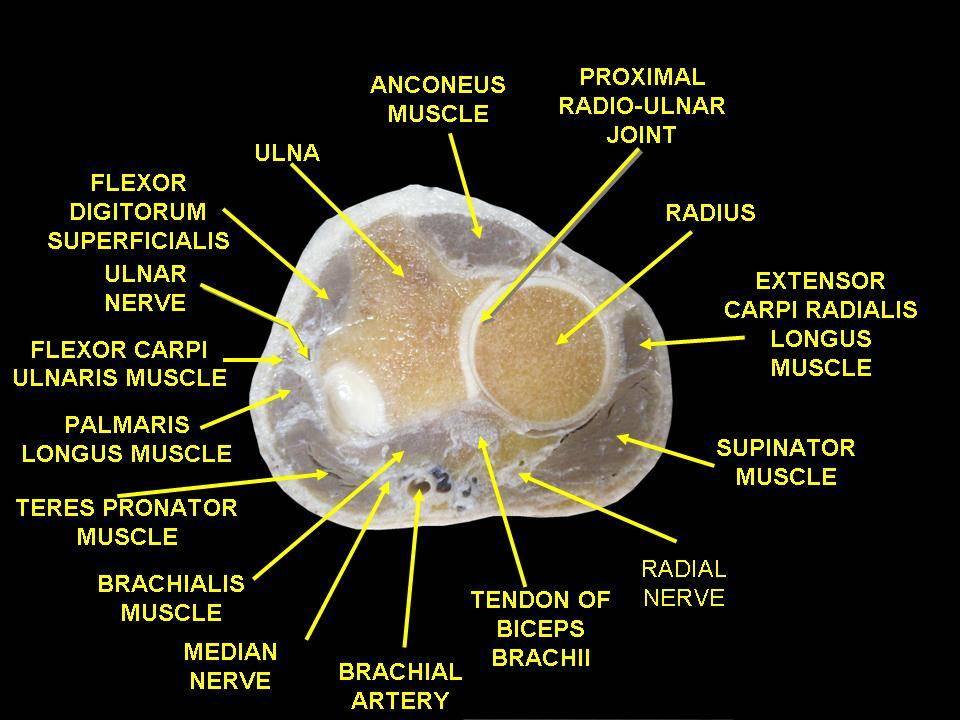
Muscles of forearm, including insertion of brachialis tendon. Cross section. (Brachialis labeled at bottom left.)

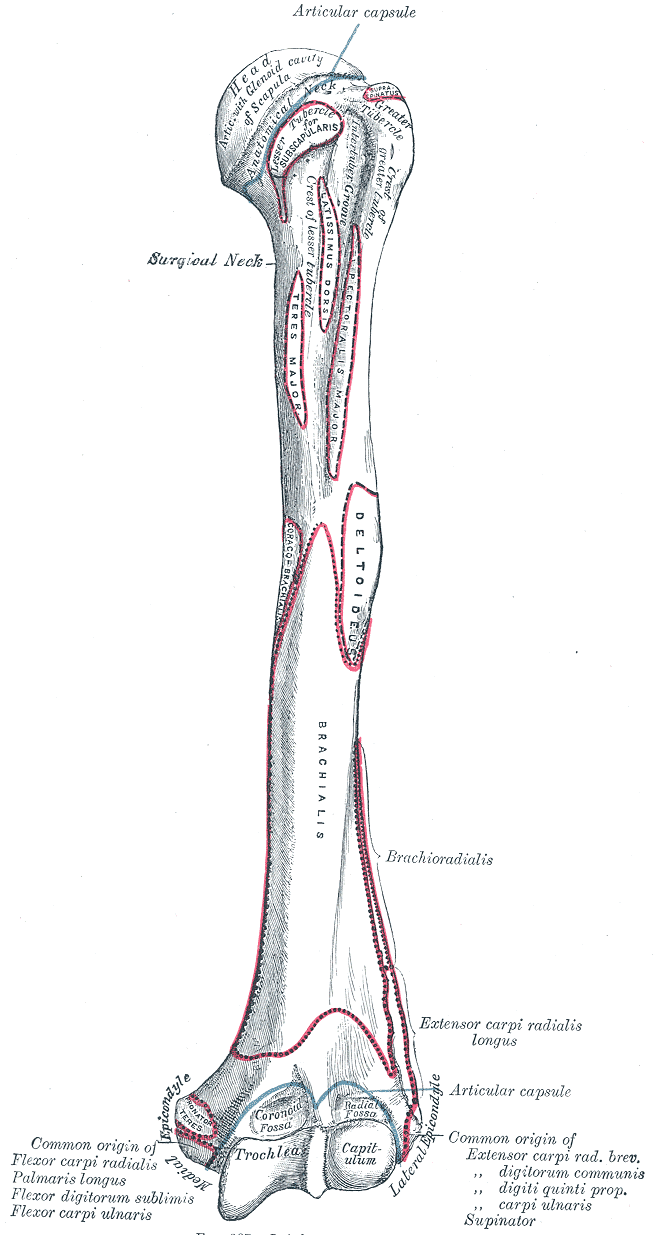
Left humerus. Anterior view.

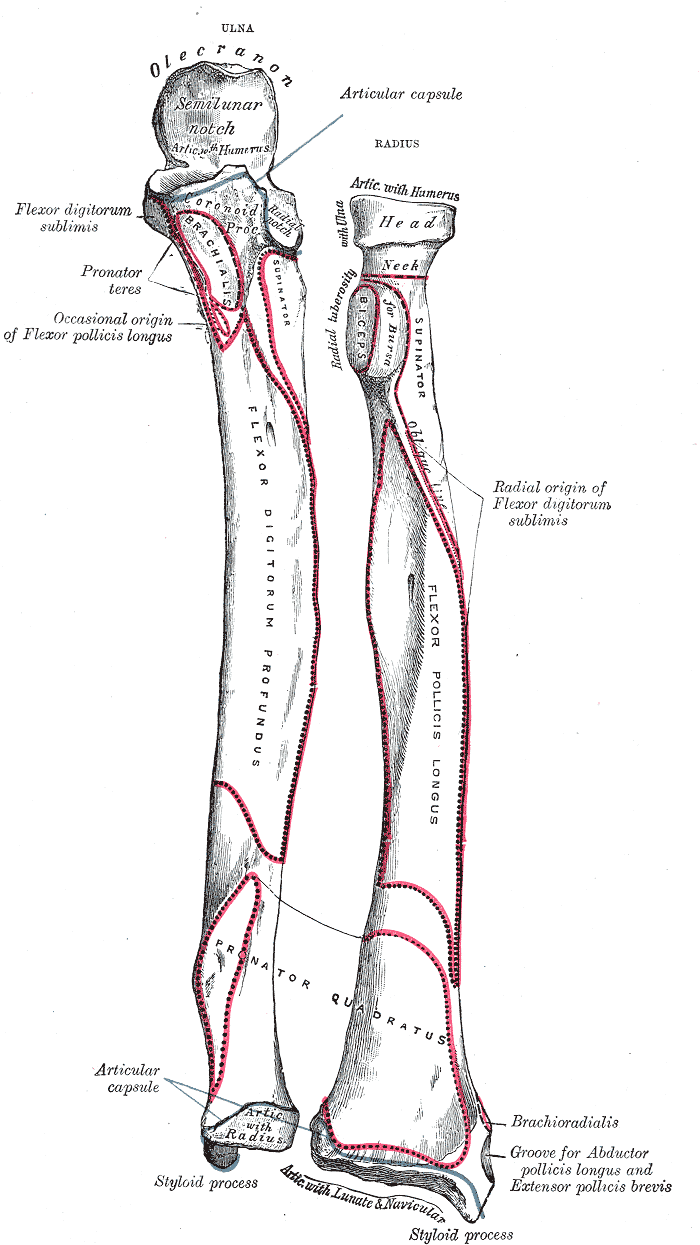
Bones of left forearm. Anterior aspect.

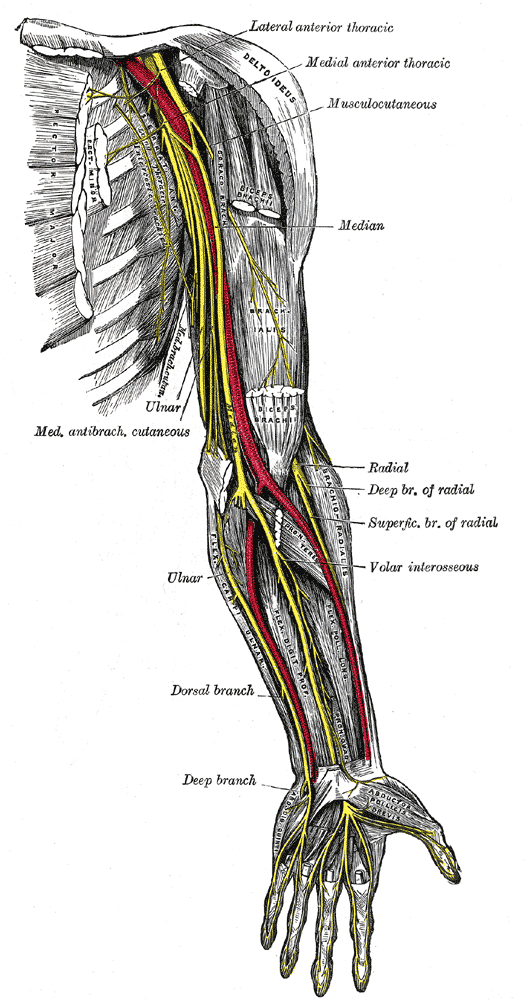
Nerves of the left upper extremity.

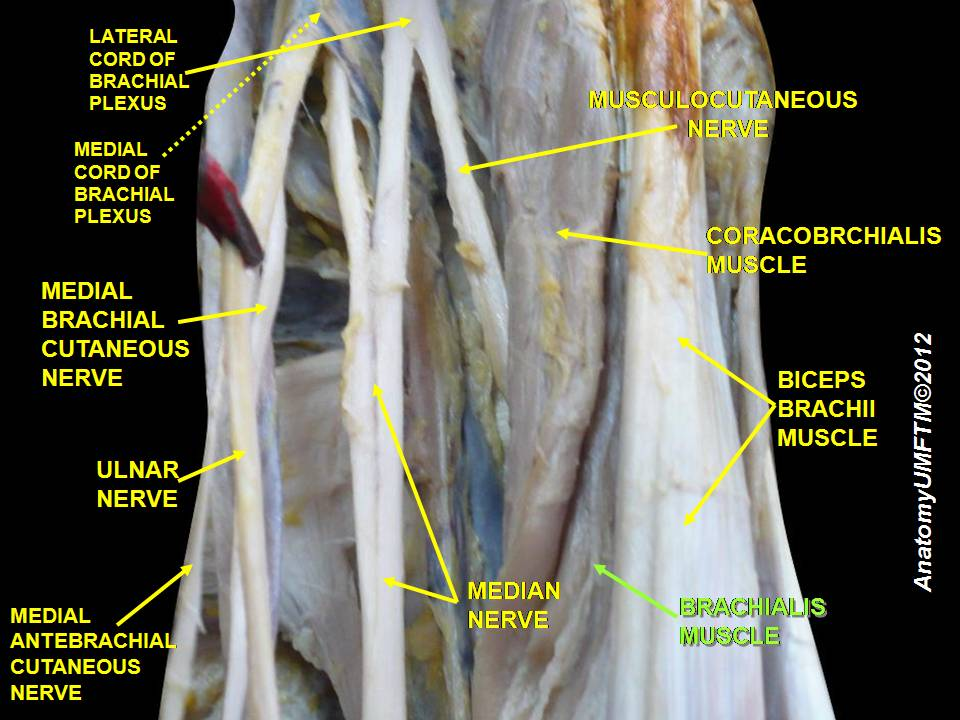
Brachialis muscle (labeled in green text)
