= Medial epicondyle fracture of the humerus =

Avulsion fracture of the elbow common in children

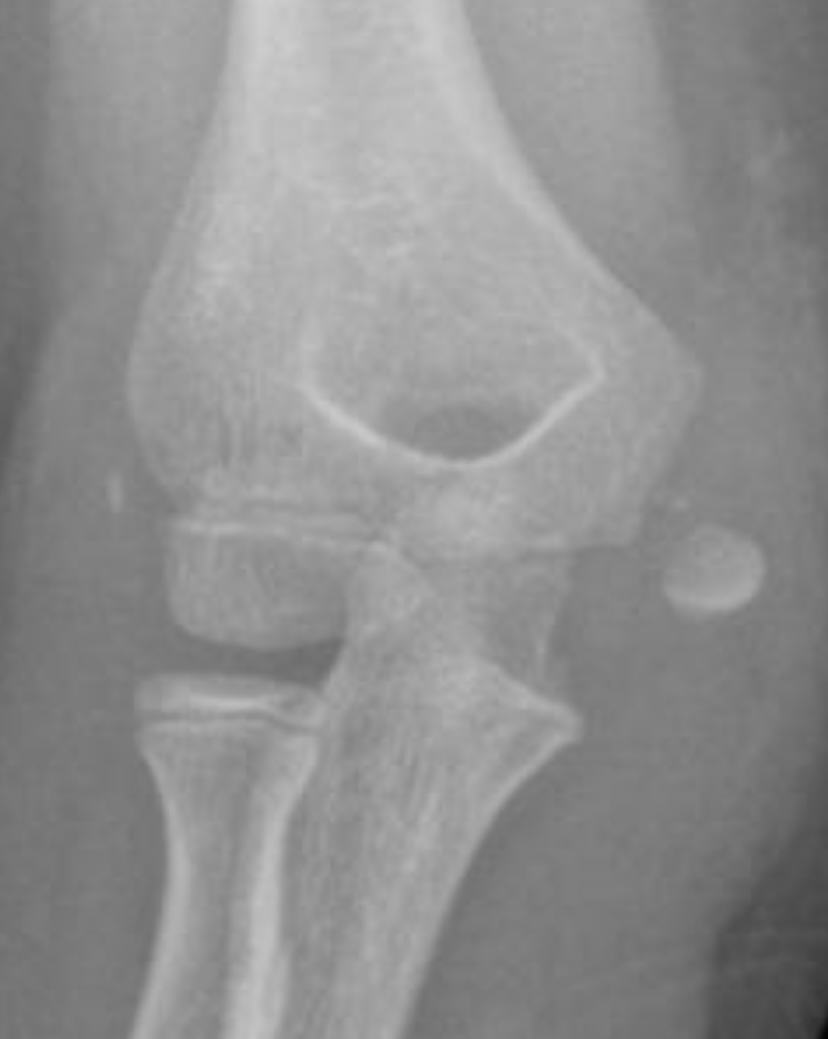
Medial Epicondyle Fracture of the Humerus

A medial epicondyle fracture is an avulsion injury to the medial epicondyle of the humerus; the prominence of bone on the inside of the elbow. Medial epicondyle fractures account for 10% elbow fractures in children. 25% of injuries are associated with a dislocation of the elbow.

Medial epicondyle fractures are typically seen in children and usually occur as a result of a fall onto an out-stretched hand. This often happen from falls from a scooter, roller skates, or monkey bars, as well as from injuries sustained playing sports. The peak age of occurrence is 10–12 years old.

Symptoms include pain, swelling, bruising and a decreased ability to move or use the elbow. Initial pain may be managed with NSAIDs, opioids, and splinting. The management of pain in children typically follows guidelines, such as those from the Royal College of Emergency Medicine.

The diagnosis is confirmed with X-rays and occasionally with a CT scan.

The treatment of these injuries is controversial, and there are currently ongoing international randomised studies. The SCIENCE study is an ongoing study funded by the National Institute for Health Research (UK). A similar study is being planned in the US, funded by the National Institutes for Health (US). These studies both seek to determine if surgery to restore the natural position of the elbow is better than allowing the bone to heal in a cast without restoring the natural position. Children and families internationally are being encouraged to participate in these research studies to resolve the uncertainties.

== Signs and symptoms ==
Symptoms include pain, swelling, bruising and a decreased ability to move or use the elbow. Blood in the soft tissues and knee joint (haemarthrosis) may lead to bruising and a doughy feel of the elbow joint.

== Cause ==
An injury resulting in an outward (valgus) stress on the elbow, such as falling on an outstretched hand causes an avulsion fracture of the medial epicondyle.

The medial epicondyle is often the final growth plate (ossification center) to ossify in the elbow. Growth plates are particularly vulnerable to injury compared to bone. Children can have an open medial epicondyle growth plate until age 13–17 years old, thus making the medial epicondyle more susceptible to injury.

Medial epicondyle fractures are associated with a dislocation of the elbow in about 25% of cases.

== Diagnosis ==
In all injuries to the medial epicondyle, radiographs (x-rays) are imperative. Computed tomography scans are occasionally useful in evaluating the degree of fracture displacement or the involvement of the joint surface.

=== Displaced Fracture ===
Studies generally use the x-ray appearance of the arm to determine how displaced a fracture is. The definition of ‘displaced fractures' are variable, with anything from 2mm to more than 15mm; however x-rays on which this assessment is made are known to be hugely misleading with fractures showing little displacement having >10mm displacement using CT scans. The practical approach is therefore to assume that any fracture that has any degree of displacement on x-rays is ‘displaced’.

== Treatment ==
There are several treatment options.

In children with a completely non-displaced fracture (i.e. the bone fragments have not moved), children will usually be treated in a cast without surgery.

In children where the fragment of medial epicondyle is trapped in the joint, or where the elbow is dislocated and can’t be readily reduced in the emergency department, then there is universal agreement that surgery is needed to realign the bones.

In children with a displaced fracture without a dislocation of the elbow (or an elbow dislocation that has been corrected), there is debate amongst surgeons about the best approach to treatment. Half of surgeons routinely recommend surgery, and half routinely recommend against surgery. The debate is whether to realign the displaced bones back into their natural position with surgery, and hold the fragments of bone with wires or screws, or whether to allow the fragments to heal in their current position by resting the elbow in a cast. Studies that have sought to draw together all of the scientific evidence, have failed to arrive at any firm conclusion, either in support of surgery or against surgery. Some point to good to results without surgery, whilst the others conclude that surgical fixation should be strongly considered to maximise the function in these children.

However, the current published research has serious methodological limitations, particularly with regard to inconsistent follow-up, no standardisation of treatment approaches, the infrequent use of patient reported outcomes, and selection bias amongst those selected to undergo operative fixation.

== Ongoing research ==
The uncertainty associated with this injury has prompted surgeons make the treatment of medial epicondyle fractures the most important unanswered question in children’s musculoskeletal injuries.

Surgeons want to determine if surgery to restore the natural position of the elbow is better than allowing the bone to heal in the injured position in a cast. The SCIENCE study is currently underway across the UK, Australia and New Zealand with more than 70 hospitals participating. It is funded by the UK National Institute for Health Research. A similar study has also recently got underway in North America, called the COMET study, which is funded by the National Institute of Health. These studies fairly allocate children to either surgery or cast, through a process called randomisation. Surgeons around the globe are calling on parents and children with this injury to help them resolve their uncertainty, by allowing their children to be part of these studies. Whilst being part of research is difficult, families may wish to consider that patients involved in research typically have better outcomes than those not involved in research (called the trial-effect).
