= Medial epicondyle of the humerus =

Rounded eminence on the medial side of the humerus

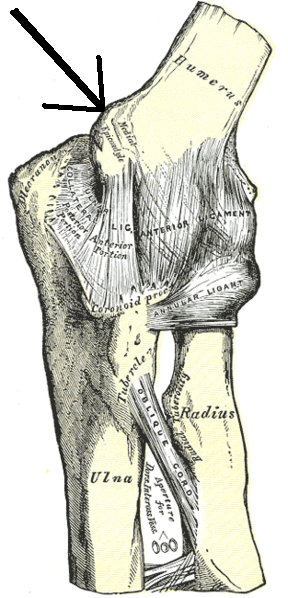
- Left elbow-joint, showing anterior and ulnar collateral ligaments. (Medial epicondyle labeled at center top.)

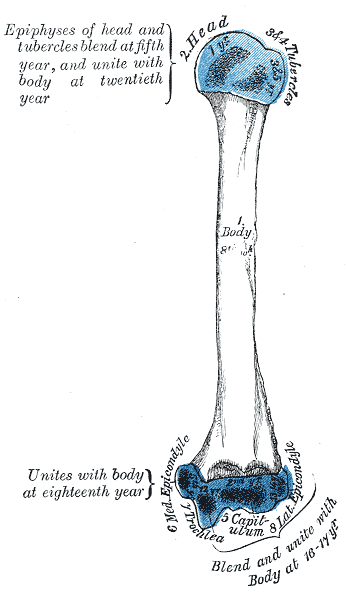
- Plan of ossification of the humerus. (Medial epicondyle labeled at lower left.)

Details

Identifiers
- Latin: epicondylus medialis humeri
- TA98: A02.4.04.027
- TA2: 1207
- FMA: 23441

The medial epicondyle of the humerus is an epicondyle of the humerus bone of the upper arm in humans. It is larger and more prominent than the lateral epicondyle and is directed slightly more posteriorly in the anatomical position. In birds, where the arm is somewhat rotated compared to other tetrapods, it is called the ventral epicondyle of the humerus. In comparative anatomy, the more neutral term entepicondyle is used.

The medial epicondyle gives attachment to the ulnar collateral ligament of elbow joint, to the pronator teres, and to a common tendon of origin (the common flexor tendon) of some of the flexor muscles of the forearm: the flexor carpi radialis, the flexor carpi ulnaris, the flexor digitorum superficialis, and the palmaris longus. The medial epicondyle is located on the distal end of the humerus. Additionally, the medial epicondyle is inferior to the medial supracondylar ridge. It is also proximal to the olecranon fossa.

The medial epicondyle protects the ulnar nerve, which runs in a groove on the back of this epicondyle. The ulnar nerve is vulnerable because it passes close to the surface along the back of the bone. Striking the medial epicondyle causes a tingling sensation in the ulnar nerve. This response is known as striking the "funny bone". The name funny bone could be from a play on the words humorous and humerus, the bone on which the medial epicondyle is located, although according to the Oxford English Dictionary, it may refer to "the peculiar sensation experienced when it is struck". Medial epicondyle fracture of the humerus are common when falling onto an outstretched hand.

== Fractures ==
Medial epicondyle fractures are common elbow injuries in children. There is considerable controversy about their treatment, with uncertainty about whether surgery to restore the natural position of the bone is better than healing in a cast.

== Additional images ==
Right medial epicondyle colored in red.

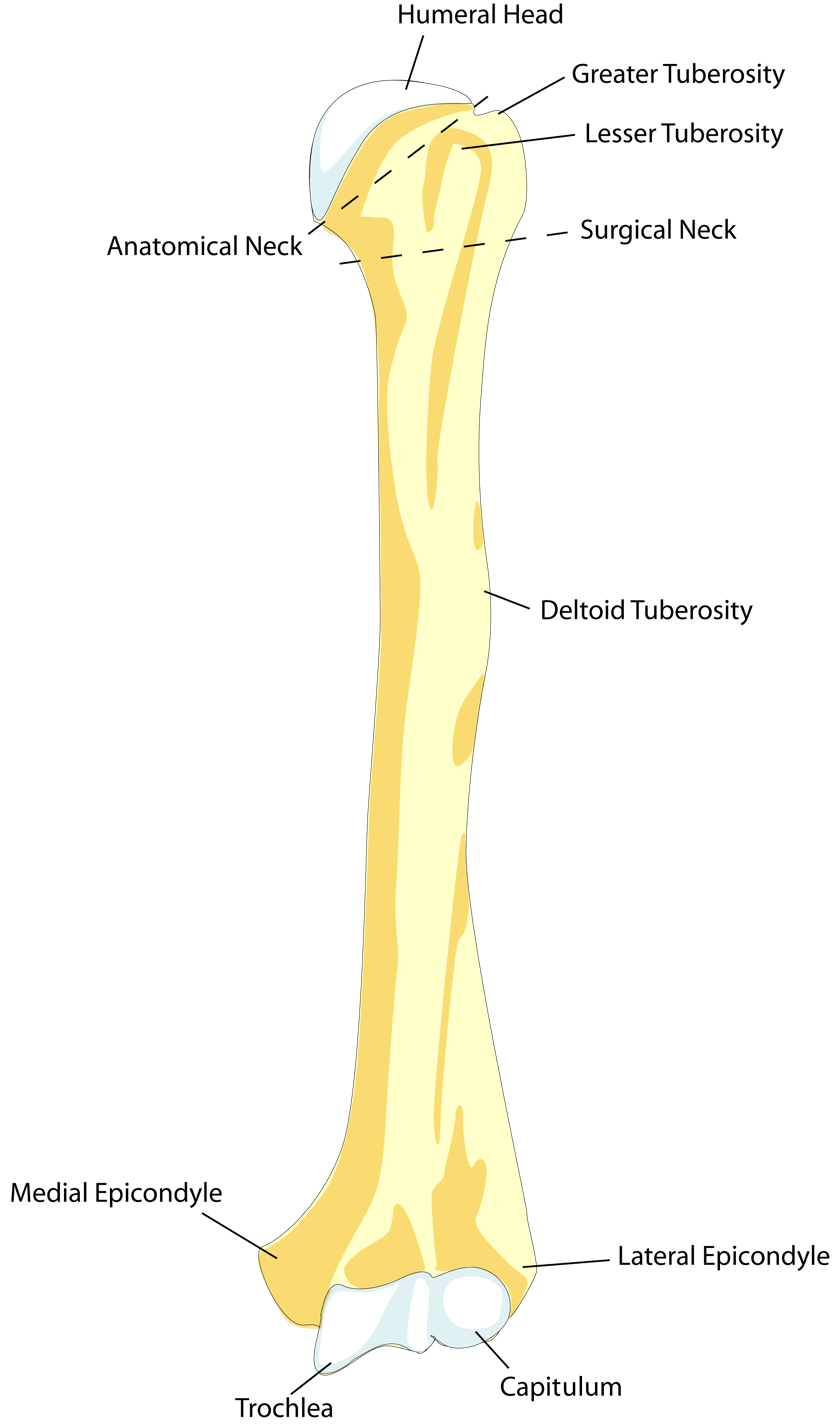
Left humerus. Anterior view.

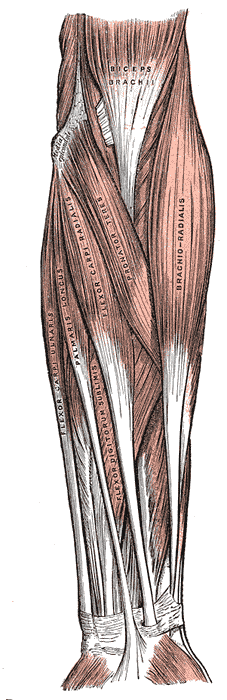
Front of the left forearm. Superficial muscles.

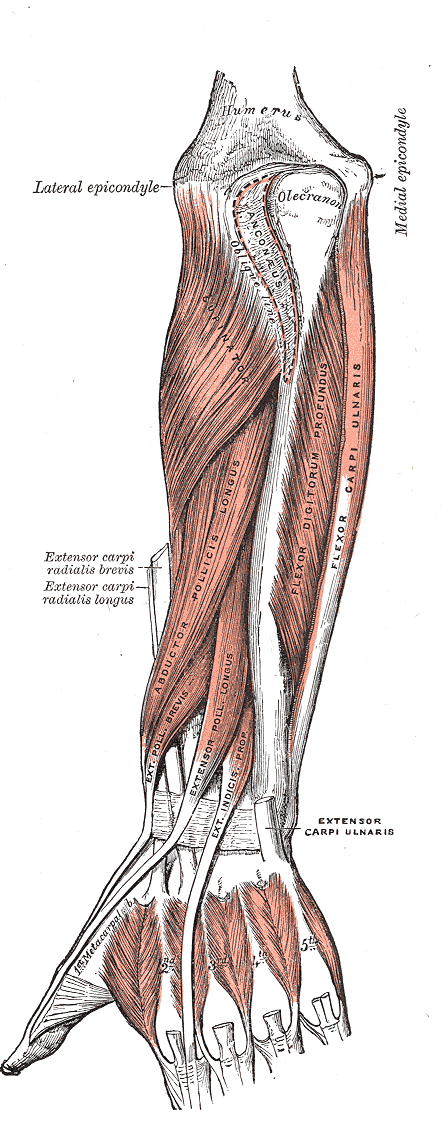
Posterior surface of the forearm. Deep muscles.

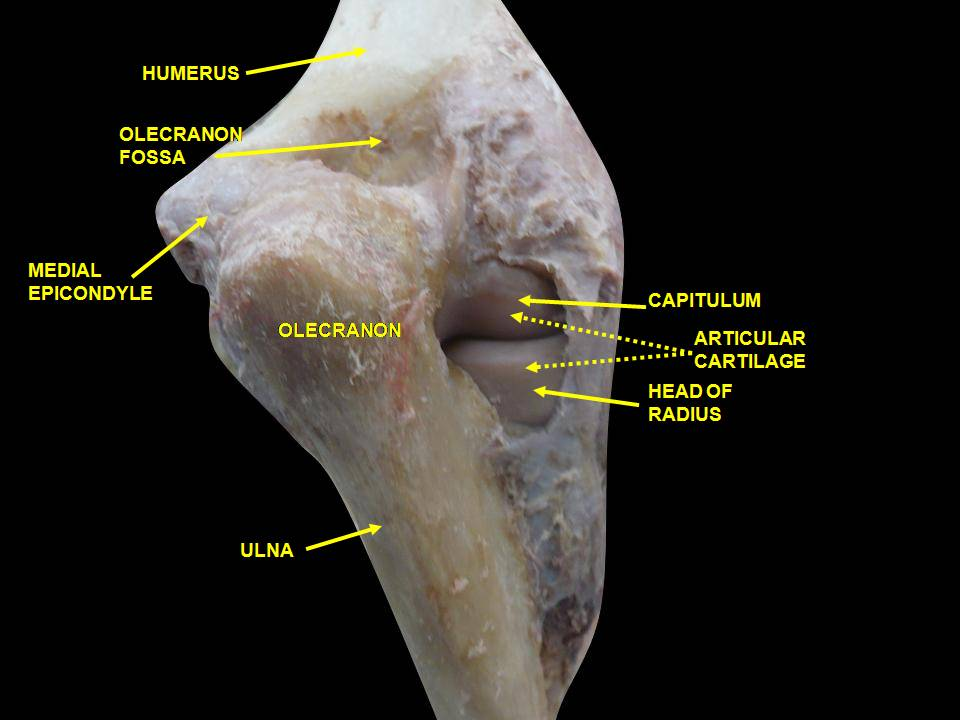
Elbow joint. Deep dissection. Posterior view.

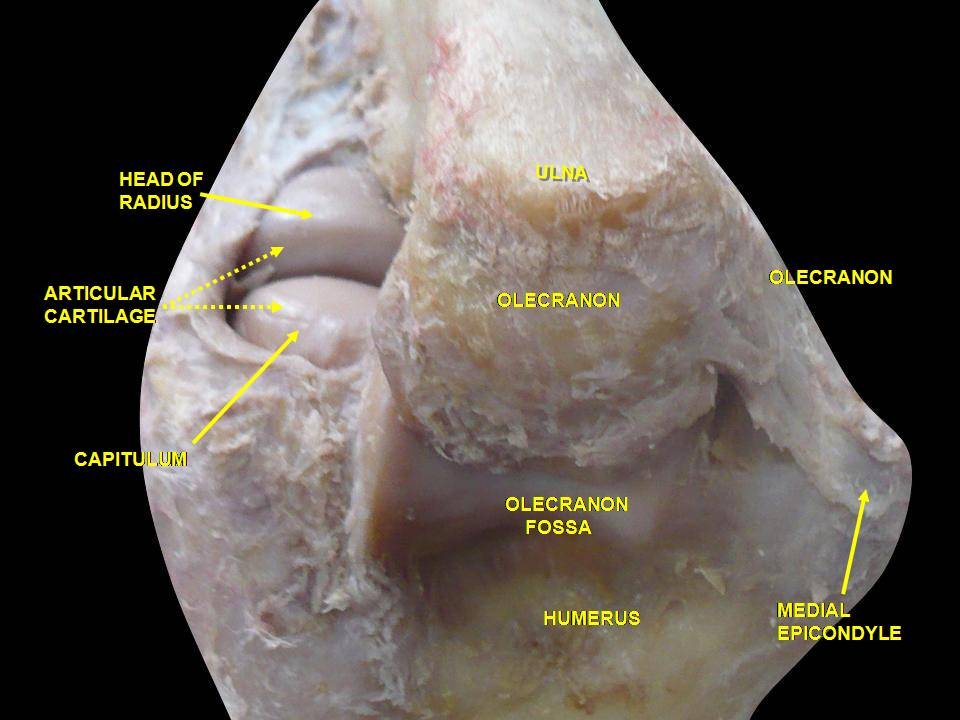
Elbow joint. Deep dissection. Posterior view.

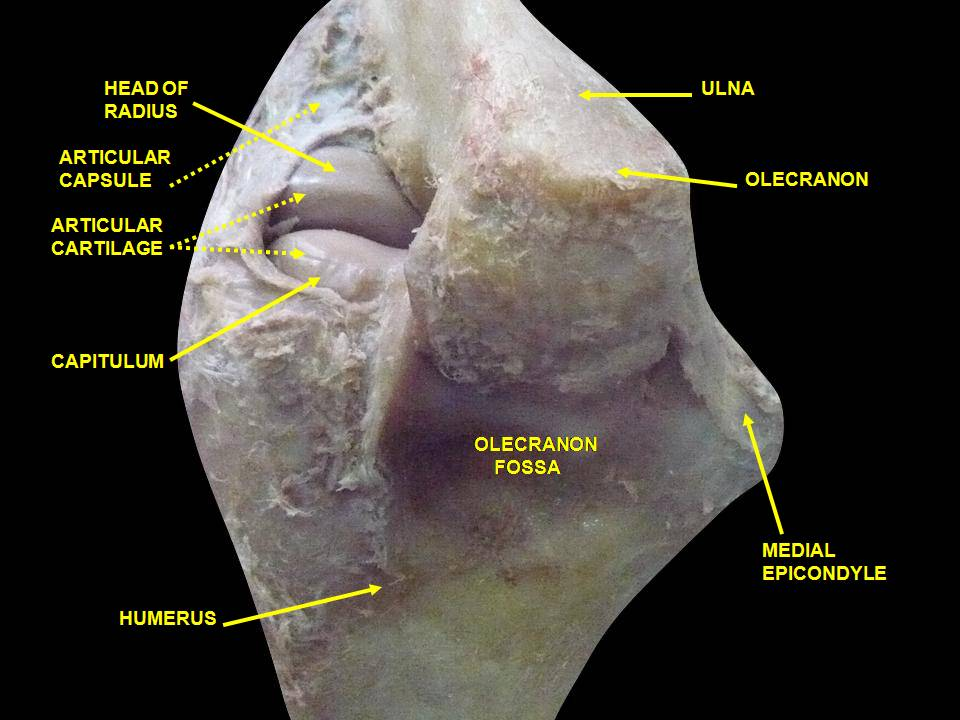
Elbow joint. Deep dissection. Posterior view.
