= Radial head fracture =

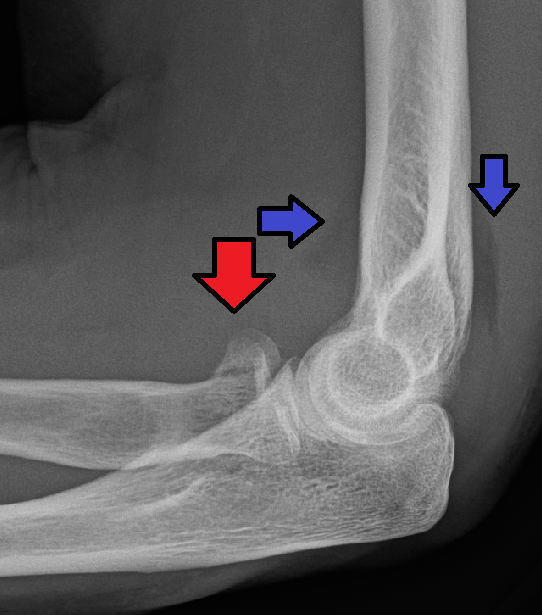
- Radial head fracture (red arrow) with posterior and anterior sail sign (blue arrows)
- Specialty: Orthopedics
- Symptoms: Pain or tenderness over the radial head; bruising; swelling; limited range of motion.
- Causes: Fall on an outstretched arm
- Diagnostic method: Based on clinical symptoms and medical imaging
- Treatment: Varies according to severity of injury but may include: immobilization followed by range of motion exercises; joint aspiration with mobilization; surgical correction

Radial head fractures are a common type of elbow fracture that typically occurs after a fall on an outstretched arm. They account for approximately one third of all elbow fractures and are frequently associated with other injuries of the elbow. Radial head fractures are diagnosed by a clinical assessment and medical imaging. A radial head fracture is treated according to the severity of the injury and its Mason-Johnston classification. Treatment may be surgical or nonsurgical. Stable isolated fractures typically have excellent outcomes. Unstable fractures with other associated injuries have varying outcomes. Common adverse outcomes include stiffness, pain, poor bone healing, and hardware complications.

== Signs and symptoms ==
Symptoms of radial head fractures typically include pain and swelling around the elbow. The elbow and forearm may have restricted movement.

== Diagnosis and classification ==
Radial head fractures are diagnosed from a clinical assessment and diagnostic imaging. Symptoms may include pain or tenderness at the radial head, bruising, swelling, and a limited range of motion of the injured elbow. Diagnostic imaging may include ultrasound, plain radiography (x-ray imaging), Computed tomography scan (CT), and magnetic resonance imaging (MRI). A fat pad sign may be present on diagnostic imaging and may indicate a radial head fracture.

A diagnosed radial head fracture can be classified according to the Mason-Johnston system.

Mason-Johnston Classification of Radial Head Fractures
Type	Description
1	Non-displaced fracture
2	Minimal displacement with angulation or impression (>2mm)
3	Comminuted fracture with dislocation
4	Radial head fracture with dislocation of the elbow

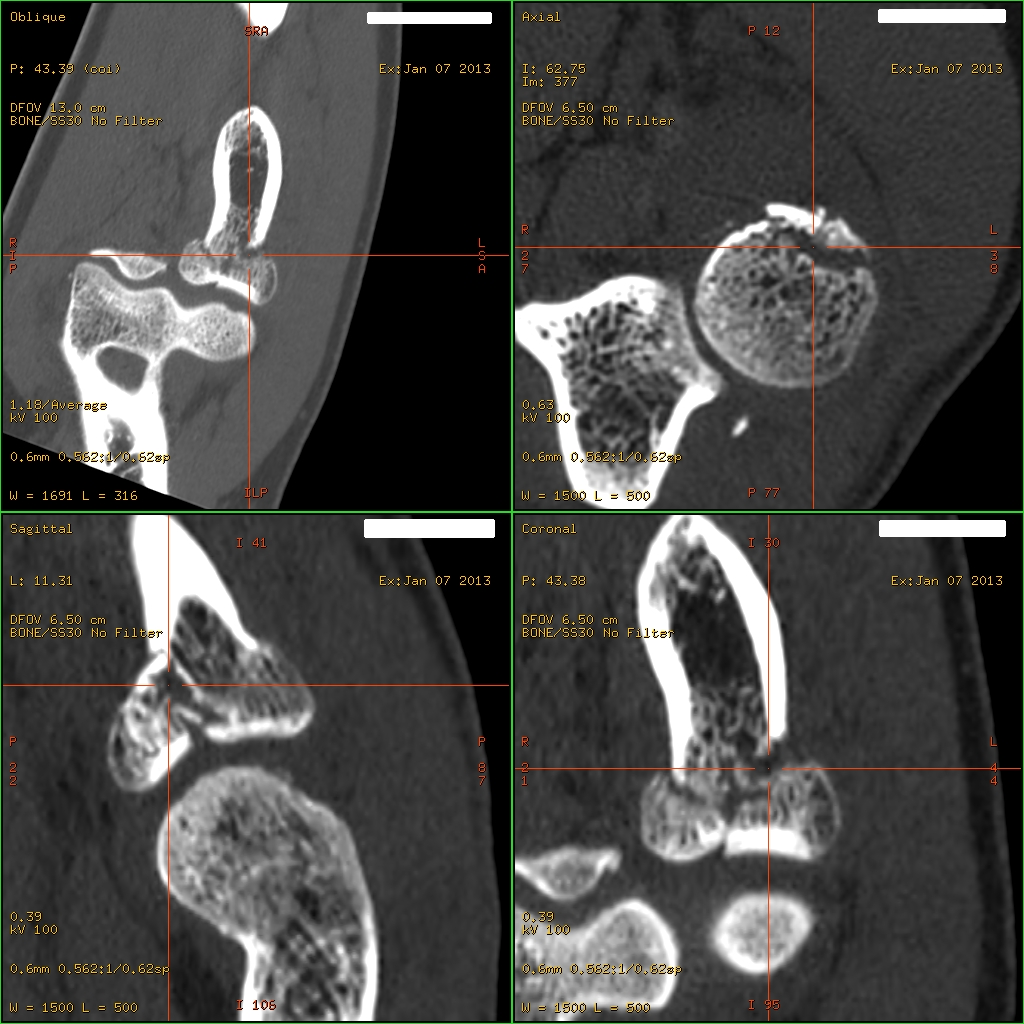
CT scan showing a radial head fracture

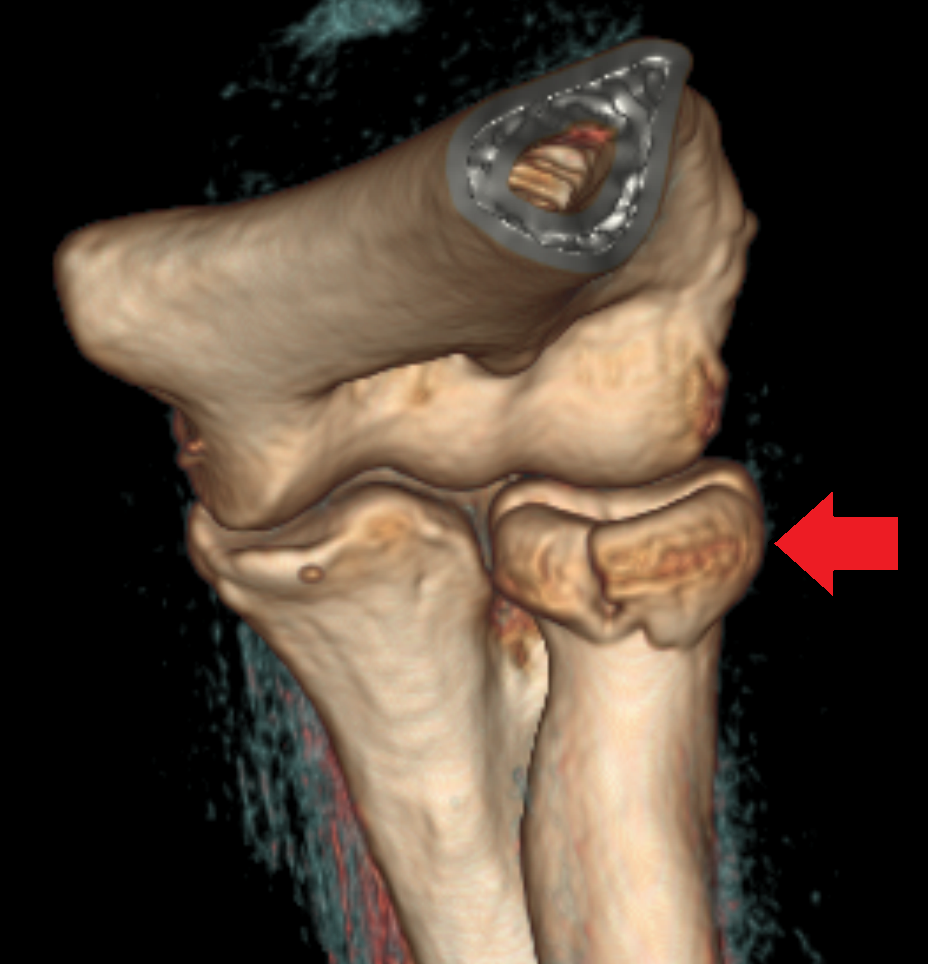
Radial head fracture seen on 3D CT reconstruction

== Treatment ==
Radial head fracture treatment is informed by the Mason-Johnston classification, patient symptoms, and fracture stability. An unstable fracture will involve fracture displacement, fractures to adjacent structures and injury to other associated soft tissues. A stable type 1 radial head fracture is typically managed with conservative measures including joint aspiration, immobilization in a sling for a few days and followed by early range of motion exercises. If range of motion is still limited after joint aspiration it may indicate a mechanical block which is treated surgically. Stable type 2 radial head fractures may be treated as a type 1 if the displacement is minimal. Unstable type 2 - 4 fractures generally warrant surgery. Surgical correction can include fracture fragment excision, radial head reconstruction, open reduction and internal fixation, and radial head excision with artificial replacement. Associated structures that were damaged during the injury may also need to be repaired.

Rehabilitation exercises are recommended and tailored to fracture and treatment type. It is recommended to wait 6 weeks before resuming load bearing with a stable type 1 fracture and 10-12 weeks following surgery for unstable type 2-4 fractures.

== Prognosis and Complications ==
Stable type 1 and 2 radial head fractures often have good outcomes with most cases regaining complete range of motion and having minimal residual stiffness or pain. Outcomes for unstable type 2-4 radial head fractures vary greatly depending on the severity of the injury and the surgical intervention. Some of the more common complications of unstable radial head fractures includes stiffness, poor bone healing, nerve damage, and pain/prominent hardware.
