= Intermediate fibers =

Fast twitch muscle fibers

Intermediate fibers, also known as fast oxidative-glycolytic fibers, are fast twitch muscle fibers which have been converted via endurance training. These fibers are slightly larger in diameter, have more mitochondria as well as a greater blood supply and more endurance than typical fast twitch fibers. Most of the body's muscles are composed of these intermediate fibers.
