= Coronoid process of the ulna =

Part of the ulna bone

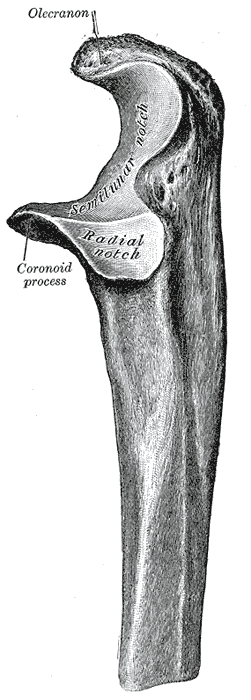
- Upper extremity of left ulna. Lateral aspect.

Details

Identifiers
- Latin: processus coronoideus ulnae
- TA98: A02.4.06.003
- TA2: 1232
- FMA: 23616

The coronoid process of the ulna is a triangular process projecting forward from the anterior proximal portion of the ulna.

== Structure ==
Its base is continuous with the body of the bone, and of considerable strength.

Its apex is pointed, slightly curved upward, and in flexion of the forearm is received into the coronoid fossa of the humerus.

Its upper surface is smooth, convex, and forms the lower part of the semilunar notch.

Its antero-inferior surface is concave, and marked by a rough impression for the insertion of the brachialis muscle. At the junction of this surface with the front of the body is a rough eminence, the tuberosity of the ulna, which gives insertion to a part of the brachialis; to the lateral border of this tuberosity the oblique cord is attached.

Its lateral surface presents a narrow, oblong, articular depression, the radial notch.

Its medial surface, by its prominent, free margin, serves for the attachment of part of the ulnar collateral ligament. At the front part of this surface is a small rounded eminence for the origin of one head of the flexor digitorum superficialis muscle; behind the eminence is a depression for part of the origin of the flexor digitorum profundus muscle; descending from the eminence is a ridge which gives origin to one head of the pronator teres muscle.

Frequently, the flexor pollicis longus muscle arises from the lower part of the coronoid process by a rounded bundle of muscular fibers.

== Function ==
The coronoid process stabilises the elbow joint and prevents hyperflexion.

== Clinical significance ==
The coronoid process can be fractured from its anteromedial facet.

== Additional images ==
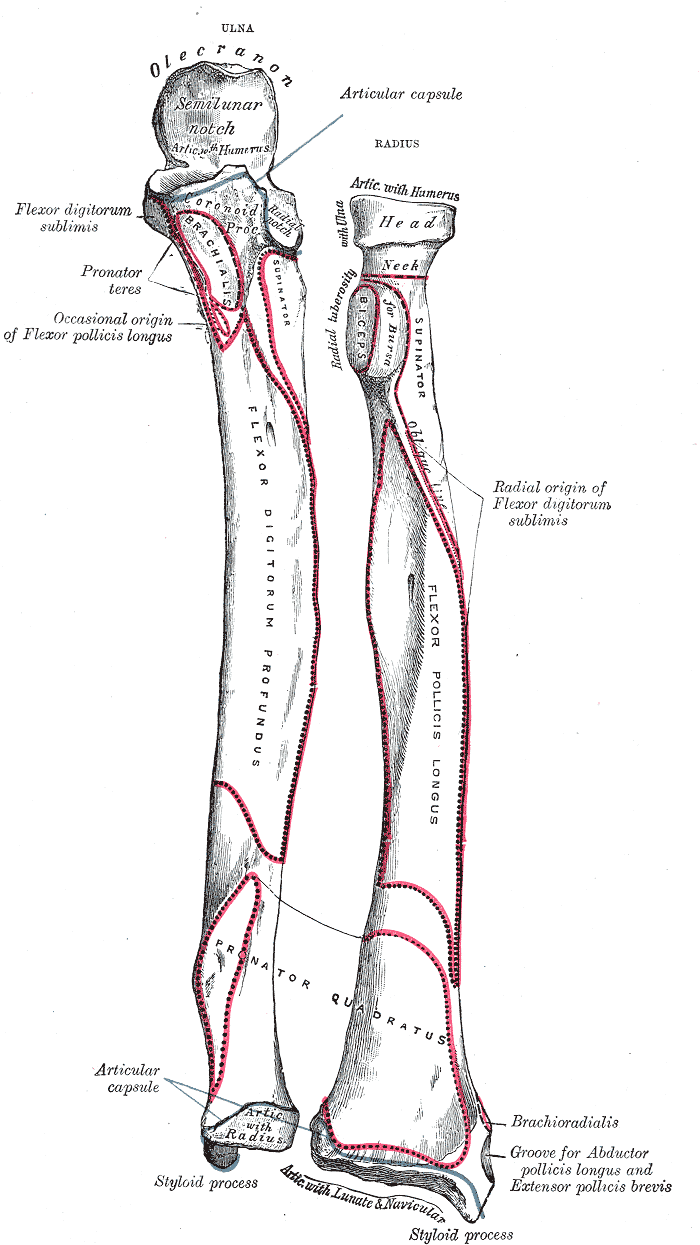
Bones of left forearm. Anterior aspect.

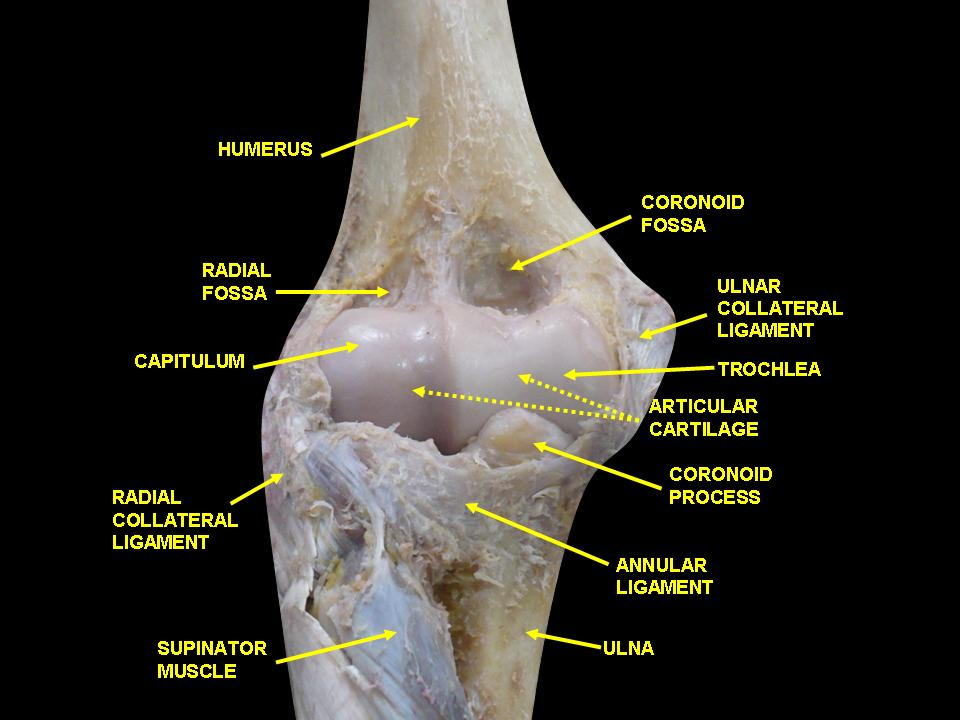
Elbow joint. Deep dissection. Anterior view.

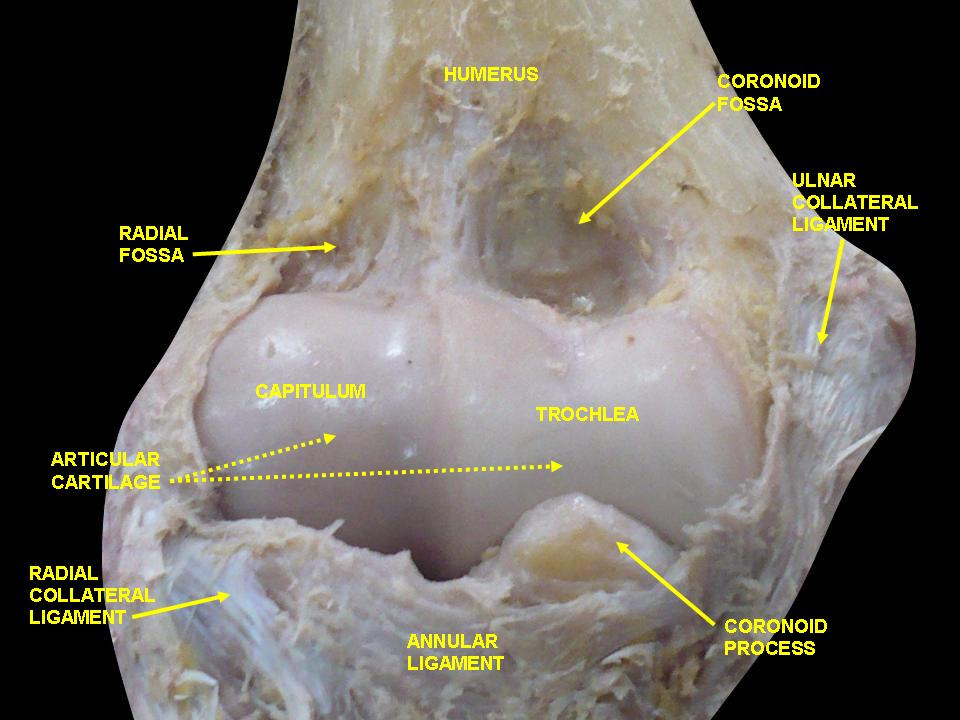
Elbow joint. Deep dissection. Anterior view.
