= Percutaneous pinning =

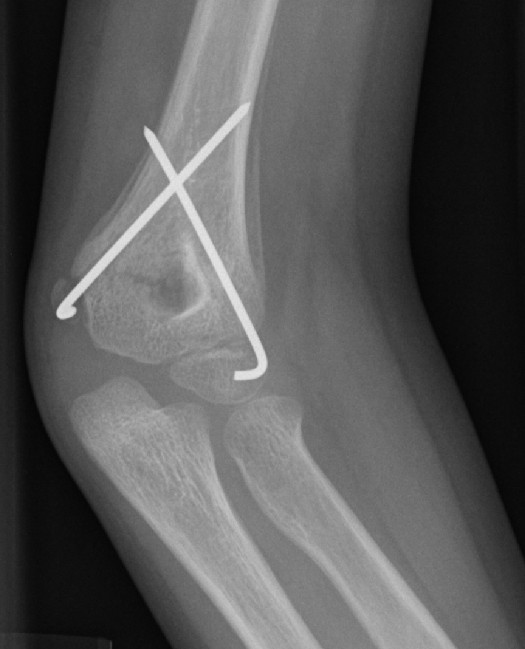
- Supracondylar humeral fracture, treated with closed reduction and pinning
- Specialty: Orthopedic
- [edit on Wikidata]

Percutaneous pinning is a technique used by orthopedic and podiatric surgeons for the stabilization of unstable fractures. Percutaneous pinning involves inserting wires through a person's skin for stabilizing the fractured bone.

== Uses ==
Many fractures can be manipulated into wholly satisfactory positions, immobilized in an appropriate cast and allowed to heal. Some fractures, however, cannot be held in a satisfactory position by this method, and require some additional form of fixation. This is the usual situation with all displaced fractures of the first metacarpal and of the proximal phalanges of the hand, and of about two thirds of fractures of the distal end of the radius. Percutaneous pinning is considered to be less invasive, faster, and requires less skill compared to open surgery (plate fixation).

Disadvantages of this technique include that the stabilized fracture is less stable compared to a surgical plate, the person may require extensive limits to their motion at the early stages, and there is a risk of joint stiffness.

== Contraindications ==
Percutaneous pinning is suggested for those who have good quality bones, and a simple fracture pattern.

== Risks or complications ==
Potential complications not related to the fracture include infections at the pin sites and injury to the nerves or tendons caused by the pins. Similar to other techniques to repair a fracture, there is also a risk that the fracture may not stay in position. There is weak evidence that there may be more complications with the use of biodegradable material for the pins compared to wire pins. More serious complications include the risk of the pins migrating (moving) and a risk for pulmonary or vascular problems.

== Technique ==
Numerous pinning techniques have been proposed, however there is not enough evidence to determine which is more effective. Pinning involves the manipulation, with X-ray guidance, of the fracture into an acceptable position, and the immediate insertion of metal pins, called Kirschner wires, through the skin, into one bone fragment and across the fracture line into the other bone fragment. These pins are normally left in position for some four to six weeks, and are removed when the fracture has healed.

Considerations include the technique chosen for skin incision, pin configuration, how many pins, the size of the pins, pin exposure (whether or not the pins are sticking out of the skin), the length of immobilization after the fracture has been pinned, the type of immobilization, how long the pins are left in place, the method for removing the pins.

The joint is usually placed in a plaster cast following percutaneous pinning. For a radial fracture, it is not clear if the position in which the wrist is immobilized in the cast after pinning effects the risk of reduced grip strength. For an approach in which the pins are placed under the skin, it is not clear if this technique reduces the risk of infection, however in order to remove the pins when the bone has healed an invasive technique may be required.

== See also ==
- Distal radius fracture
