= Glenoid tubercles =

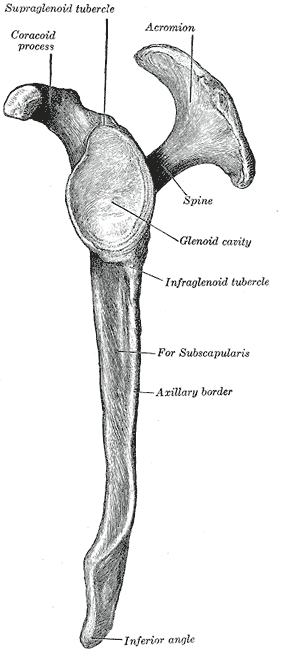
- Left scapula. Lateral view.

The glenoid tubercles are two small bony eminences (or tubercles) located above and below the glenoid cavity on the scapula. The glenoid tubercles consist of the supra- and the infraglenoid tubercle. The Latin terms supra and infra meaning above and below respectively refers to the tubercles location in relation to the glenoid cavity. The Latin term glenoid meaning socket or cavity refers to the glenoid cavity.

The glenoid tubercles serves as attachment points for the long heads of the biceps brachii and the triceps brachii muscles.

== Supraglenoid tubercle ==
The supraglenoid tubercle is where for the long head of the biceps brachii muscle originates. It is a small, rough projection superior to the glenoid cavity near the base of the coracoid process. The name supraglenoid tubercle refers to its location above the glenoid cavity.

== Infraglenoid tubercle ==
The infraglenoid tubercle is where the long head of the triceps brachii originates. The infraglenoid tubercle is located on the lateral part of the scapula, inferior to (below) the glenoid cavity. The name infraglenoid tubercle refers to its location below the glenoid cavity.

== Additional images ==
Position of supraglenoid tubercle (shown in red). Left scapula.

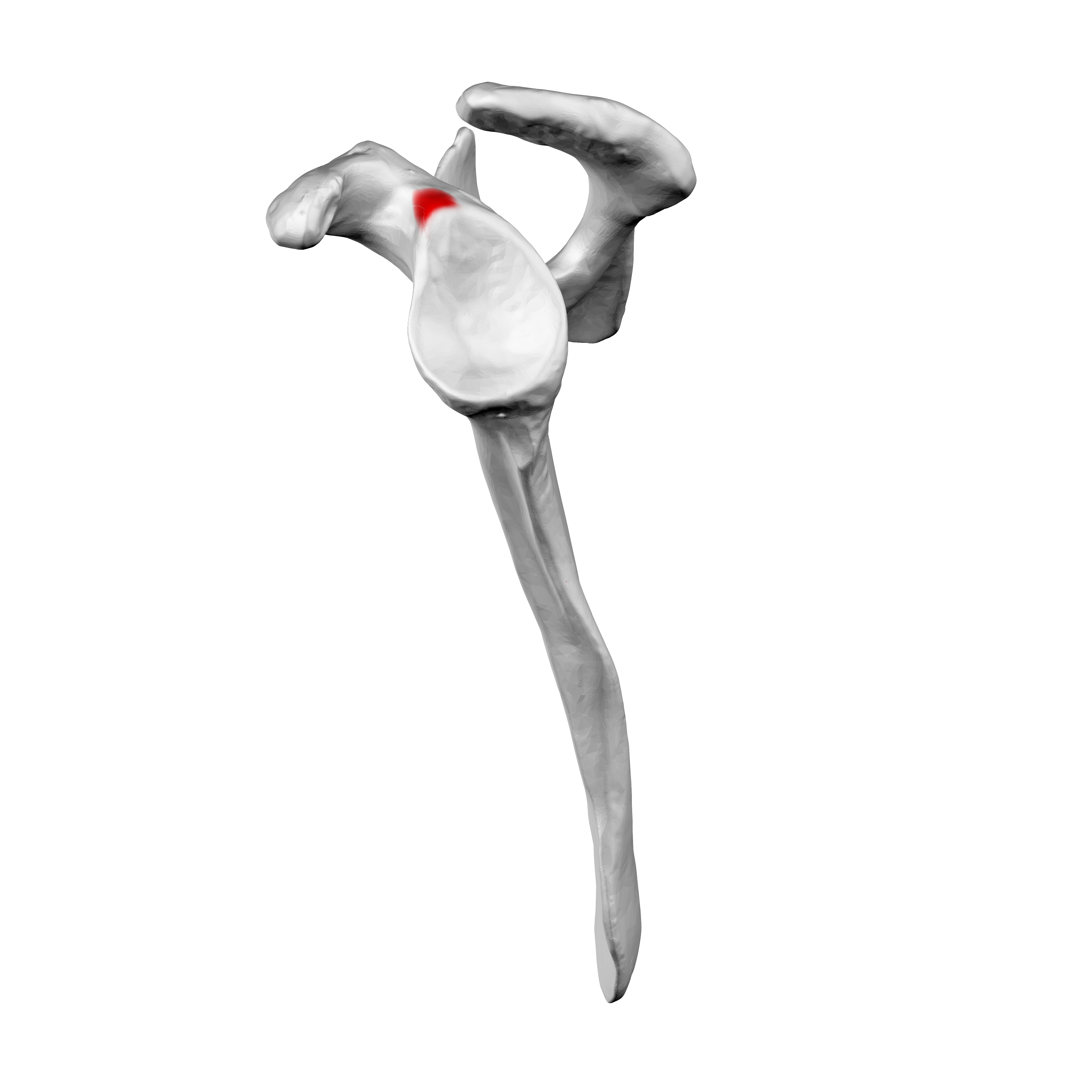
Still image. Left scapula, lateral view.

Position of supraglenoid tubercle (shown in red). Animation.

Left scapula. Infraglenoid tubercle shown in red.

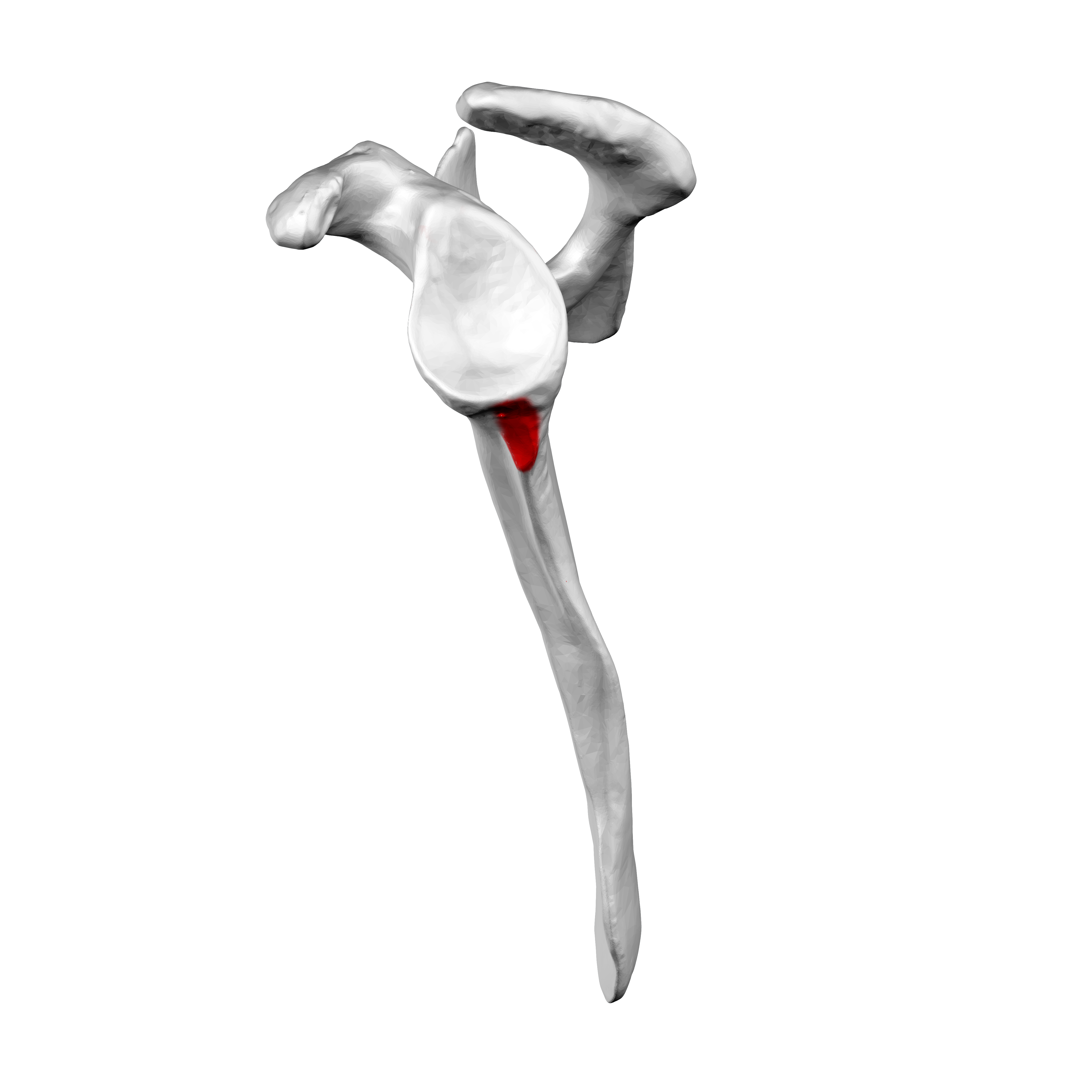
Lateral view of left scapula. Infraglenoid tubercle shown in red.

Animation. Infraglenoid tubercle shown in red.
