= Teres =

Teres may refer to:

== People ==
- Teres I, the first king of the Odrysian state of Thrace (reigned 475-445 BC)
- Teres II, king of the Odrysians in middle Thrace from 351 BC to 342 BC
- Teres III, king of the Odrysians in Thrace in ca. 149 BC
- Teres Lindberg (born 1974), Swedish politician and trade unionist
- Teres Shulkowsky (born 1989), Israeli footballer
- Epifani Olives i Terès (died 1602), a royal commissioner of King Philip III of Spain, nephew of Joan Terès i Borrull
- Joan Terès i Borrull (1538-1603), Spanish archbishop and viceroy of Catalonia

== Other uses ==
- Teres muscle (disambiguation)
- Teres Ridge, Livingston Island, Antarctica
