= Supraglenoid tubercle =

Region of the scapula from which the long head of the biceps brachii muscle originates

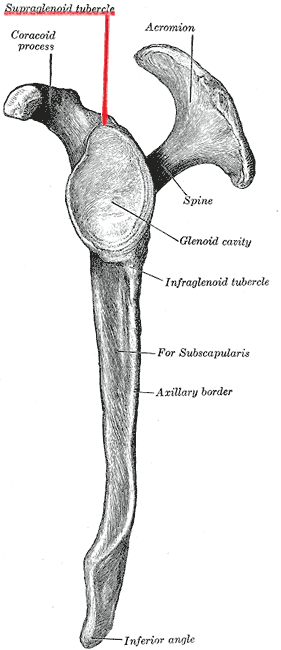
- Left scapula. Lateral view. Supraglenoid tubercle labeled in red.

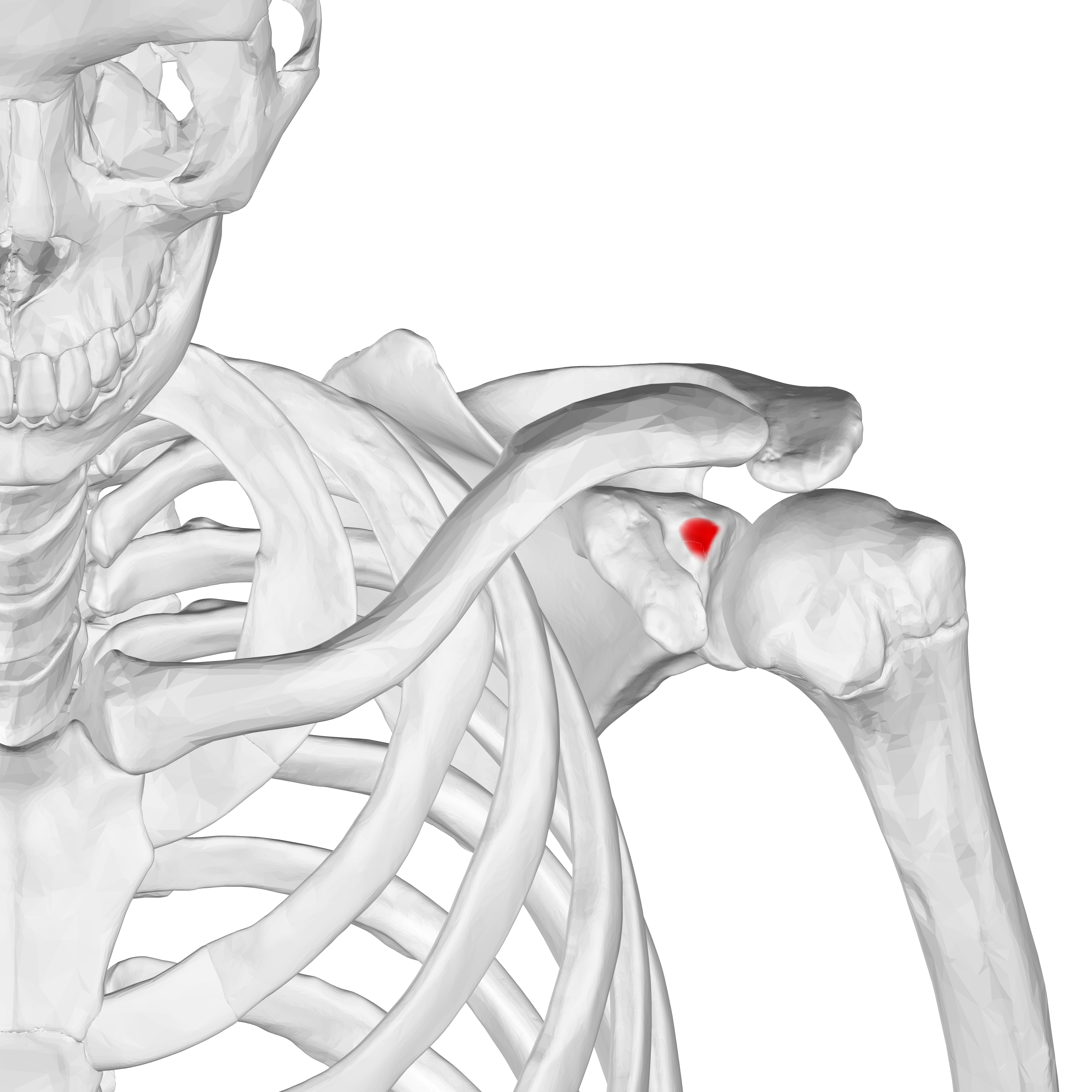
- Bones of left shoulder. Supraglenoid tubercle shown in red.

Details

Identifiers
- Latin: tuberculum supraglenoidale
- TA98: A02.4.01.020
- TA2: 1163
- FMA: 23263

The supraglenoid tubercle is a region of the scapula from which the long head of the biceps brachii muscle originates. It is a small, rough projection superior to the glenoid cavity near the base of the coracoid process. The term supraglenoid is from the Latin supra, meaning above, and glenoid, meaning socket or cavity.

== Clinical relevance ==
=== Biceps tendonitis ===
Biceps tendonitis originates on the long head of the biceps brachii at the supraglenoid tubercle in 30% of cases. The main symptom is generally anterior biceps instability, but the disease can also be characterized by chronic anterior shoulder pain which radiates towards the lateral part of the elbow. In cases of biceps tendinitis, steroids can be injected fluoroscopically at the supraglenoid tubercle to reduce pain associated with the pathology.

=== Avulsion ===
The supraglenoid tubercle ossifies separately from the rest of the scapula, so may not be as strong as the rest of the bone. It can be pulled off (avulsed), often after an excessively strong contraction of the biceps brachii. This may also cause a fracture of the surrounding parts of the scapula, particularly the glenoid cavity. This may also occur in horses. This type of bone fracture is quite rare.

== Additional images ==
Position of supraglenoid tubercle (shown in red). left scapula.

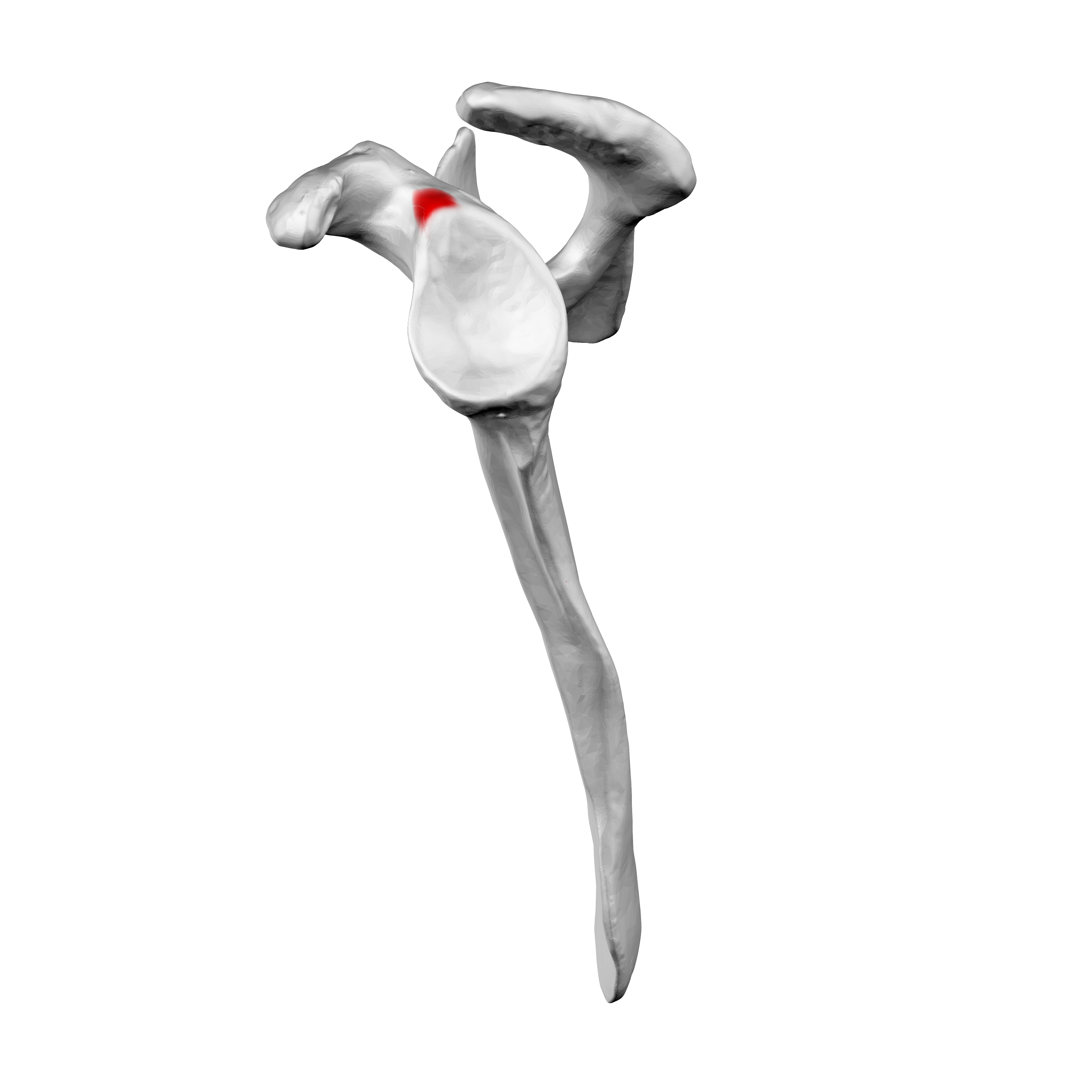
Still image. Left scapula, lateral view.

Position of supraglenoid tubercle (shown in red). Animation.

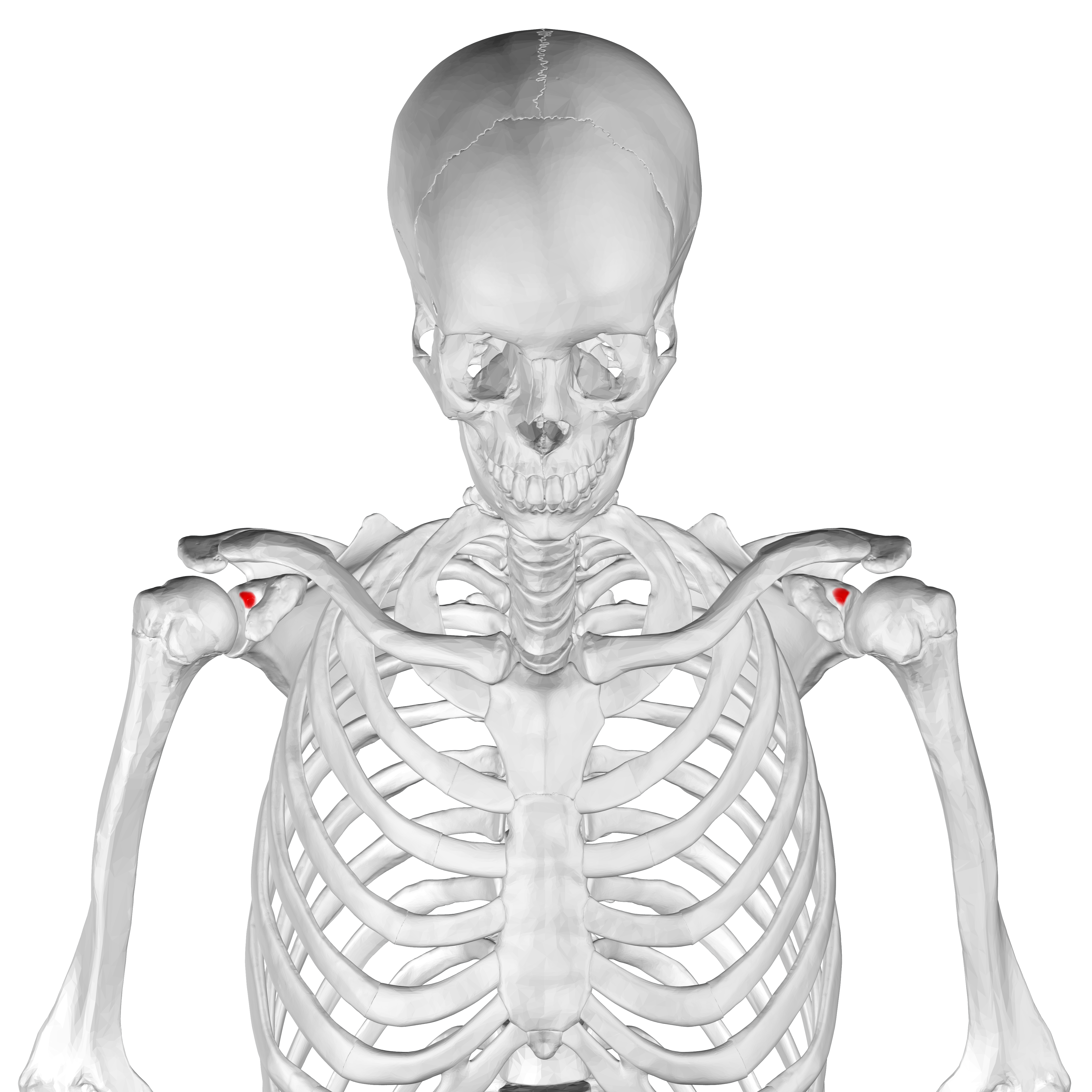
Still image.

== See also ==
- Infraglenoid tubercle
