= Infraglenoid tubercle =

Part of the scapula from which the long head of the triceps brachii originates

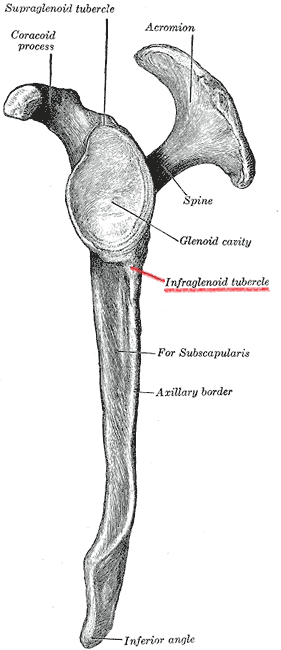
- Lateral view of left scapula (infraglenoid tubercle labeled at center right)

Details

Identifiers
- Latin: tuberculum infraglenoidale
- TA98: A02.4.01.021
- TA2: 1164
- FMA: 23266

The infraglenoid tubercle is the part of the scapula from which the long head of the triceps brachii muscle originates. The infraglenoid tubercle is a tubercle located on the lateral part of the scapula, inferior to (below) the glenoid cavity. The name infraglenoid tubercle refers to its location below the glenoid cavity.

== Function ==
The infraglenoid tubercle is the origin of the long head of the triceps brachii muscle. It helps to stabilise the muscle origin.

== Additional images ==
Left scapula. Infraglenoid tubercle shown in red.

Animation. Infraglenoid tubercle shown in red.

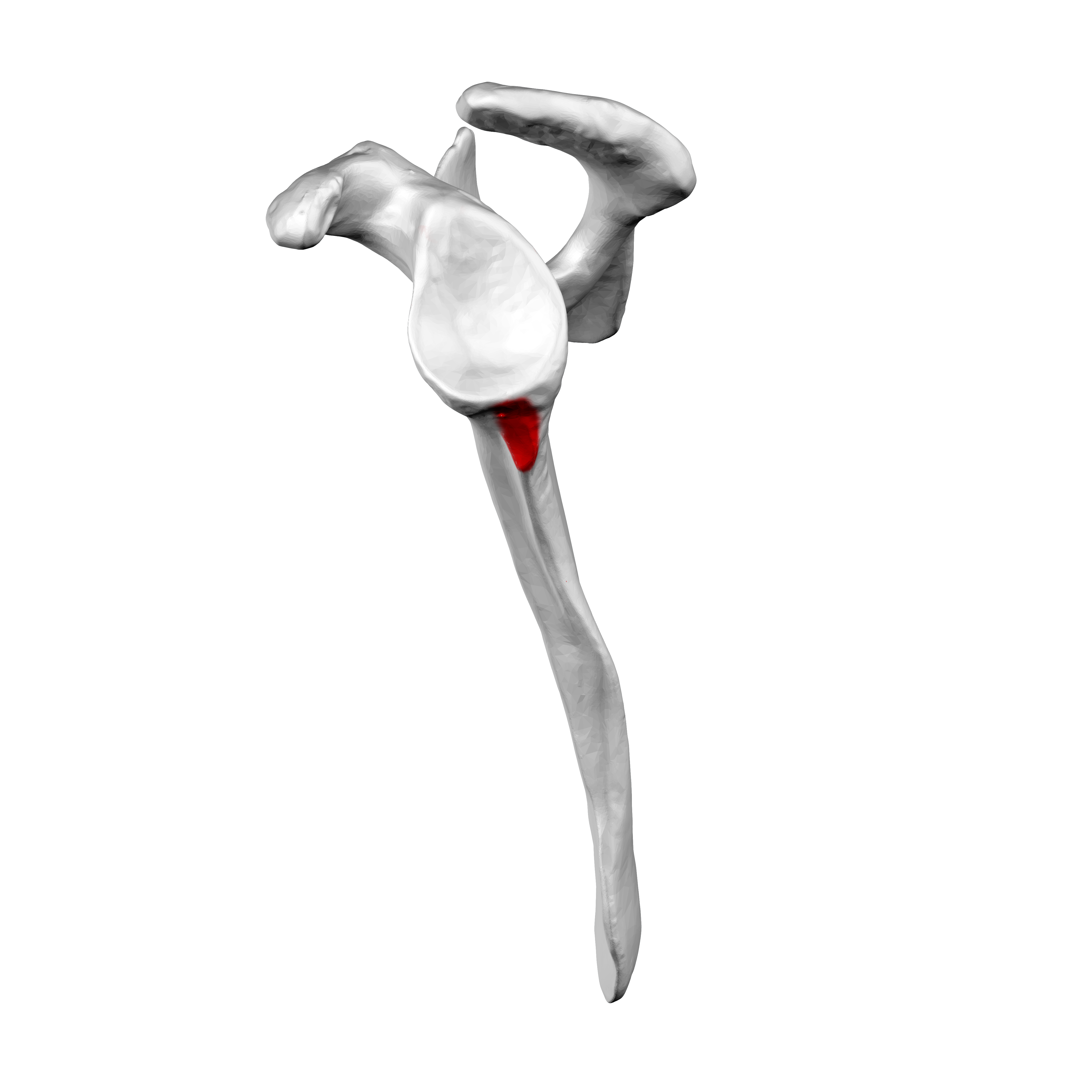
Lateral view of left scapula. Infraglenoid tubercle shown in red.

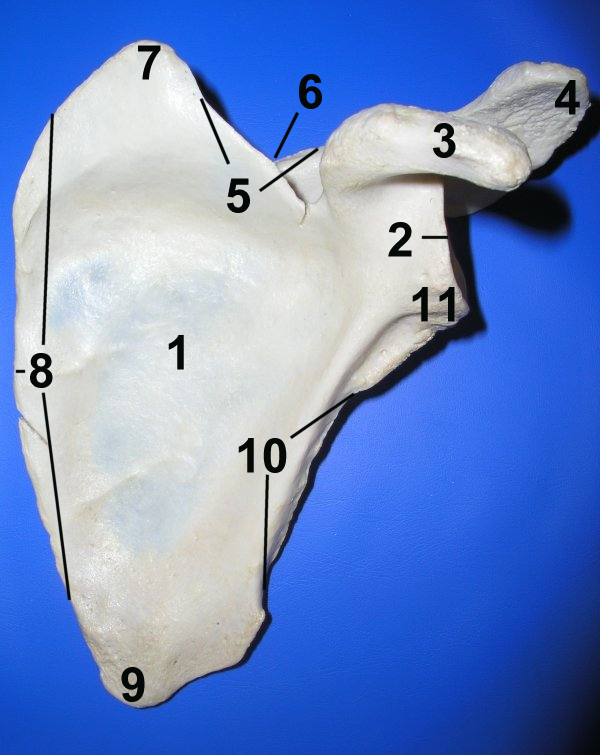
Anterior surface of left scapula. Infraglenoid tubercle is "11"

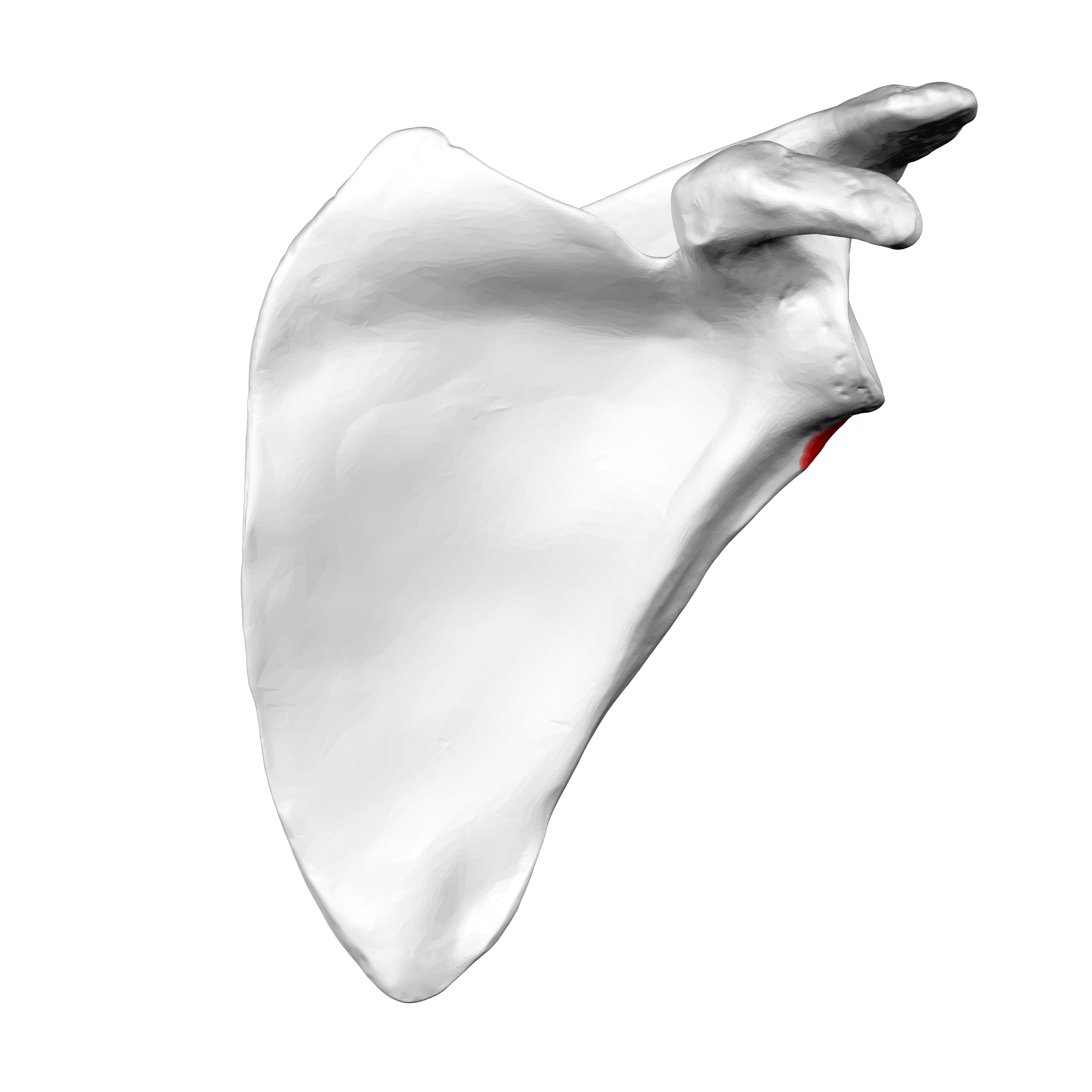
Anterior surface of left scapula. Infraglenoid tubercle shown in red.

== See also ==
- Supraglenoid tubercle
