= Teres muscle =

Teres muscle may refer to:

- Pronator teres muscle
- Teres major muscle
- Teres minor muscle
