= Myosin =

Family of motor proteins

A family of motor proteins that use energy from ATP hydrolysis to produce force and movement along actin filaments. Examples of myosin-based motility include muscle contraction, cytokinesis (the cleavage of two daughter cells during cell division), and movement of intracellular organelles.

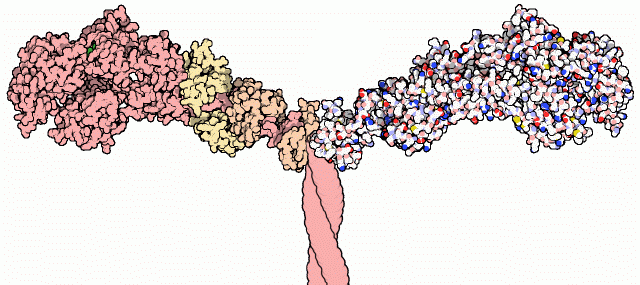
Part of the myosin II structure. Atoms in the heavy chain are colored pink (on the left-hand side); atoms in the light chains are colored faded-orange and faded-yellow (also on the left-hand side).

Myosins (/ˈmaɪəsɪn, -oʊ-/) are a family of motor proteins (though most often protein complexes) best known for their roles in muscle contraction and in a wide range of other motility processes in eukaryotes. They are ATP-dependent and responsible for actin-based motility.

The first myosin (M2) to be discovered was in 1864 by Wilhelm Kühne. Kühne had extracted a viscous protein from skeletal muscle that he held responsible for keeping the tension state in muscle. He called this protein myosin. The term has been extended to include a group of similar ATPases found in the cells of both striated muscle tissue and smooth muscle tissue.

Following the discovery in 1973 of enzymes with myosin-like function in Acanthamoeba castellanii, a global range of divergent myosin genes have been discovered throughout the realm of eukaryotes.

Although myosin was originally thought to be restricted to muscle cells (hence myo-(s) + -in), there is no single "myosin"; rather it is a very large superfamily of genes whose protein products share the basic properties of actin binding, ATP hydrolysis (ATPase enzyme activity), and force transduction. Virtually all eukaryotic cells contain myosin isoforms. Some isoforms have specialized functions in certain cell types (such as muscle), while other isoforms are ubiquitous. The structure and function of myosin is globally conserved across species, to the extent that rabbit muscle myosin II will bind to actin from an amoeba.

== Structure and functions ==
=== Domains ===
Most myosin molecules are composed of a head, neck, and tail domain.

- The head domain binds the filamentous actin, and uses ATP hydrolysis to generate force and to "walk" along the filament towards the barbed (+) end (with the exception of myosin VI, which moves towards the pointed (-) end).
- the neck domain acts as a linker and as a lever arm for transducing force generated by the catalytic motor domain. The neck domain can also serve as a binding site for myosin light chains which are distinct proteins that form part of a macromolecular complex and generally have regulatory functions.
- The tail domain generally mediates interaction with cargo molecules and/or other myosin subunits. In some cases, the tail domain may play a role in regulating motor activity.

=== Power stroke ===
Multiple myosin II molecules generate force in skeletal muscle through a power stroke mechanism fuelled by the energy released from ATP hydrolysis. The power stroke occurs at the release of phosphate from the myosin molecule after the ATP hydrolysis while myosin is tightly bound to actin. The effect of this release is a conformational change in the molecule that pulls against the actin. The release of the ADP molecule leads to the so-called rigor state of myosin. The binding of a new ATP molecule will release myosin from actin. ATP hydrolysis within the myosin will cause it to bind to actin again to repeat the cycle. The combined effect of the myriad power strokes causes the muscle to contract.

== Nomenclature, evolution, and the family tree ==
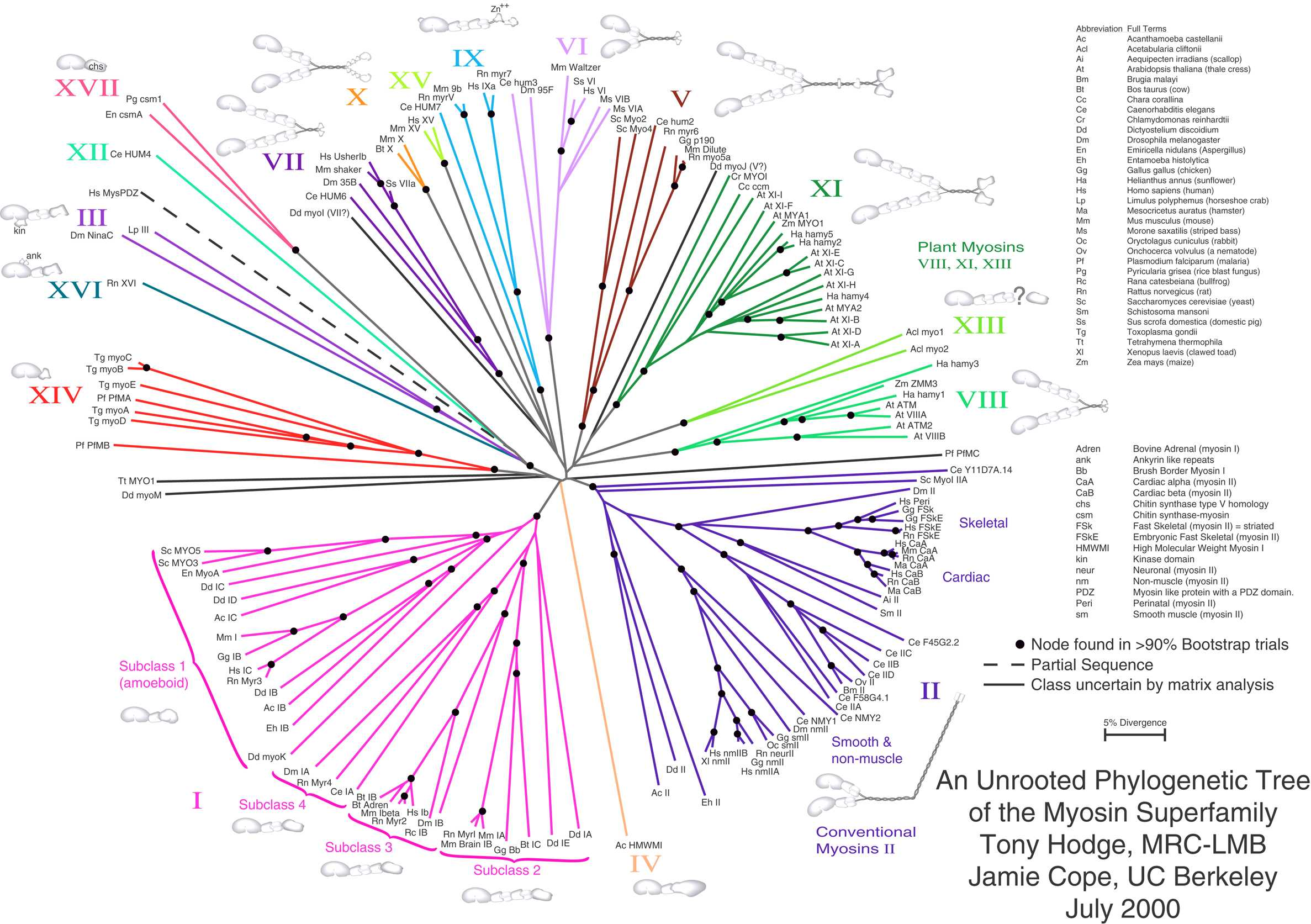
Myosin unrooted phylogenetic tree

The wide variety of myosin genes found throughout the eukaryotic phyla were named according to different schemes as they were discovered. The nomenclature can therefore be somewhat confusing when attempting to compare the functions of myosin proteins within and between organisms.

Skeletal muscle myosin, the most conspicuous of the myosin superfamily due to its abundance in muscle fibers, was the first to be discovered. This protein makes up part of the sarcomere and forms macromolecular filaments composed of multiple myosin subunits. Similar filament-forming myosin proteins were found in cardiac muscle, smooth muscle, and nonmuscle cells. However, beginning in the 1970s, researchers began to discover new myosin genes in simple eukaryotes encoding proteins that acted as monomers and were therefore entitled Class I myosins. These new myosins were collectively termed "unconventional myosins" and have been found in many tissues other than muscle. These new superfamily members have been grouped according to phylogenetic relationships derived from a comparison of the amino acid sequences of their head domains, with each class being assigned a Roman numeral (see phylogenetic tree). The unconventional myosins also have divergent tail domains, suggesting unique functions. The now diverse array of myosins likely evolved from an ancestral precursor (see picture).

Evolutionary analysis of Myosin II genes in vertebrates shows a pattern of class-specific duplications of skeletal and cardiac myosins. These show that some Myosin II forms are conserved across vertebrates (e.g., MYH3 and MYH13), while others have undergone a duplication-loss replacement process.

Analysis of the amino acid sequences of different myosins shows great variability among the tail domains, but strong conservation of head domain sequences. Presumably this is so the myosins may interact, via their tails, with a large number of different cargoes, while the goal in each case – to move along actin filaments – remains the same and therefore requires the same machinery in the motor. For example, the human genome contains over 40 different myosin genes.

These differences in shape also determine the speed at which myosins can move along actin filaments. The hydrolysis of ATP and the subsequent release of the phosphate group causes the "power stroke", in which the "lever arm" or "neck" region of the heavy chain is dragged forward. Since the power stroke always moves the lever arm by the same angle, the length of the lever arm determines the displacement of the cargo relative to the actin filament. A longer lever arm will cause the cargo to traverse a greater distance even though the lever arm undergoes the same angular displacement – just as a person with longer legs can move farther with each individual step. The velocity of a myosin motor depends upon the rate at which it passes through a complete kinetic cycle of ATP binding to the release of ADP.

=== Myosin classes ===
==== Myosin I ====
Myosin I, a ubiquitous cellular protein, functions as monomer and functions in vesicle transport. It has a step size of 10 nm and has been implicated as being responsible for the adaptation response of the stereocilia in the inner ear.

==== Myosin II ====
Sliding filament model of muscle contraction.

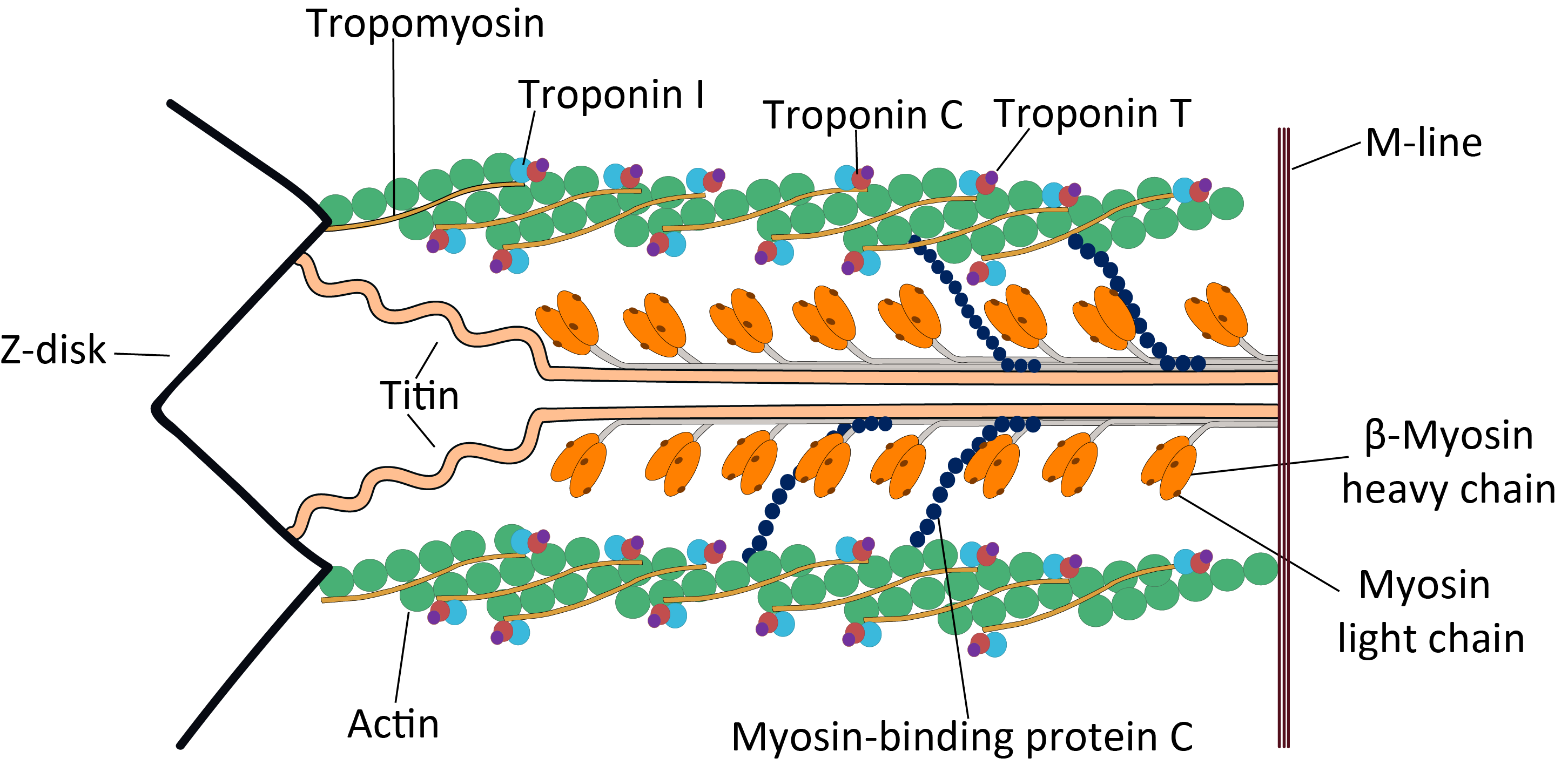
Cardiac sarcomere structure featuring myosin

Myosin II (also known as conventional myosin) is the myosin type responsible for producing muscle contraction in muscle cells in most animal cell types. It is also found in non-muscle cells in contractile bundles called stress fibers.

- Myosin II contains two heavy chains, each about 2000 amino acids in length, which constitute the head and tail domains. Each of these heavy chains contains the N-terminal head domain, while the C-terminal tails take on a coiled-coil morphology, holding the two heavy chains together (imagine two snakes wrapped around each other, as in a caduceus). Thus, myosin II has two heads. The intermediate neck domain is the region creating the angle between the head and tail. In smooth muscle, a single gene (MYH11)) codes for the heavy chains myosin II, but splice variants of this gene result in four distinct isoforms.
- It also contains 4 myosin light chains (MLC), resulting in 2 per head, weighing 20 (MLC_{20}) and 17 (MLC_{17}) kDa. These bind the heavy chains in the "neck" region between the head and tail.
  - Self-inhibition of Myosin II. The movie begins with Myosin II in the 10S conformation with a folded tail domain, the blocked head and free head. The movie schematically depicts tail unfolding and the resulting active 6S confirmation followed by tail folding back to the 10S conformation. The illustration is conceptual: transitory states and diffusive motions associated with folding/unfolding are not shown.
    The MLC_{20} is also known as the regulatory light chain and actively participates in muscle contraction.
  - The MLC_{17} is also known as the essential light chain. Its exact function is unclear, but is believed to contribute to the structural stability of the myosin head along with MLC_{20}. Two variants of MLC_{17} (MLC_{17a/b}) exist as a result of alternative splicing at the MLC_{17} gene.

In muscle cells, the long coiled-coil tails of the individual myosin molecules can auto-inhibit active function in the 10S conformation or upon phosphorylation, change to the 6S conformation and join, forming the thick filaments of the sarcomere. The force-producing head domains stick out from the side of the thick filament, ready to walk along the adjacent actin-based thin filaments in response to the proper chemical signals and may be in either auto-inhibited or active conformation. The balance/transition between active and inactive states is subject to extensive chemical regulation.

==== Myosin III ====
Myosin III is a poorly understood member of the myosin family. It has been studied in vivo in the eyes of Drosophila, where it is thought to play a role in phototransduction. A human homologue gene for myosin III, MYO3A, has been uncovered through the Human Genome Project and is expressed in the retina and cochlea.

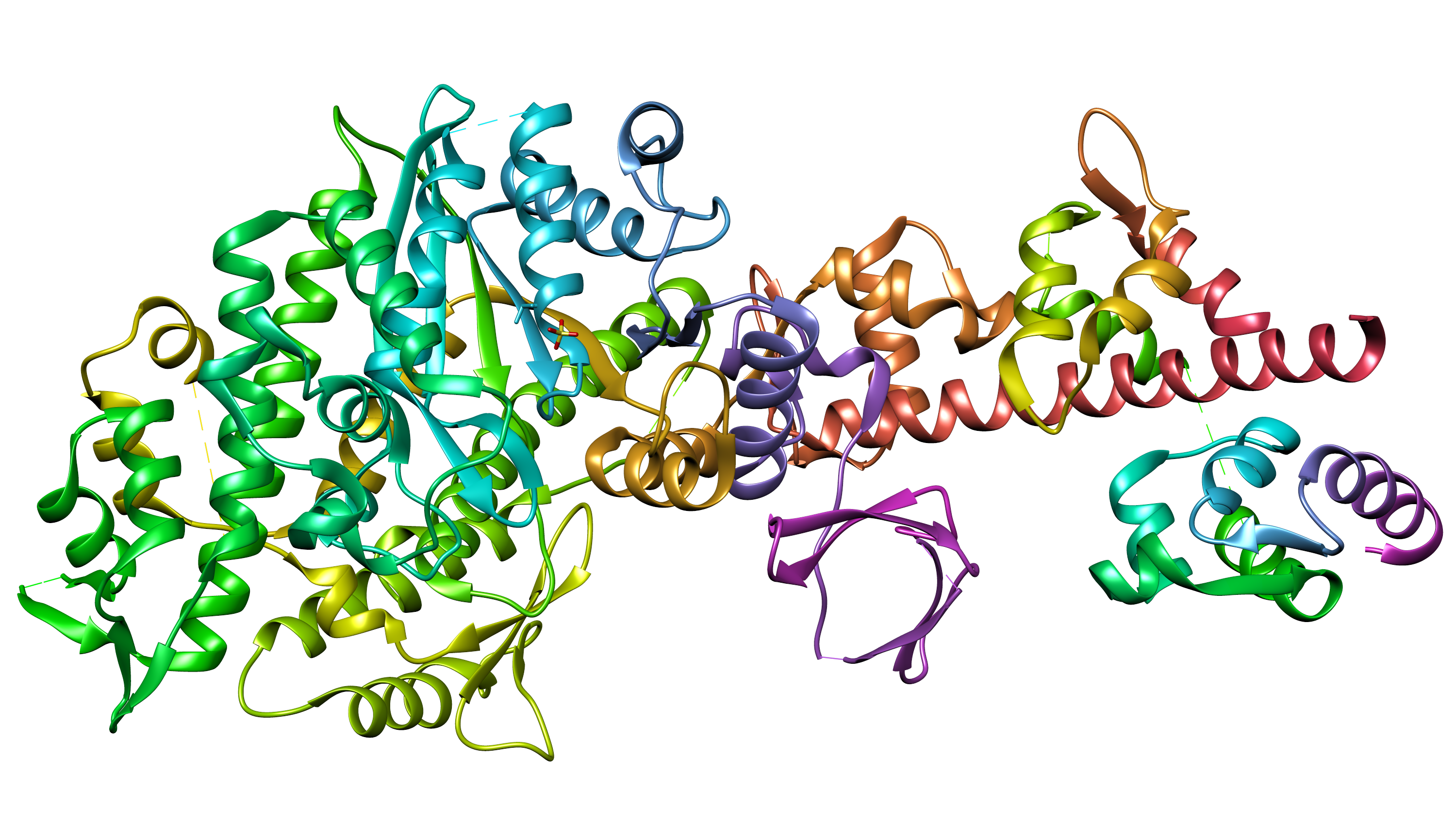
Crystal structure of myosin V motor with essential light chain – nucleotide-free

==== Myosin IV ====
Myosin IV has a single IQ motif and a tail that lacks any coiled-coil forming sequence. It has homology similar to the tail domains of Myosin VII and XV.

==== Myosin V ====
Myosin V is an unconventional myosin motor, which is processive as a dimer and has a step size of 36 nm. It translocates (walks) along actin filaments traveling towards the barbed end (+ end) of the filaments. Myosin V is involved in the transport of cargo (e.g. RNA, vesicles, organelles, mitochondria) from the center of the cell to the periphery, but has been furthermore shown to act like a dynamic tether, retaining vesicles and organelles in the actin-rich periphery of cells. A recent single molecule in vitro reconstitution study on assembling actin filaments suggests that Myosin V travels farther on newly assembling (ADP-Pi rich) F-actin, while processive runlengths are shorter on older (ADP-rich) F-actin.

A ribbon diagram of the Myosin V molecular motor pseudo-colored to illustrate major subdomains. In the interest of visual clarity, important loops (which are often labeled separately in the literature) are not singled out. This perspective highlights the nucleotide-binding site and the separation of the U50 and L50 subdomains which form the actin-binding site cleft.

The Myosin V motor head can be subdivided into the following functional regions:

- Nucleotide-binding site - These elements together coordinate di-valent metal cations (usually magnesium) and catalyze hydrolysis:
  - Switch I - This contains a highly conserved SSR motif. Isomerizes in the presence of ATP.
  - Switch II - This is the Kinase-GTPase version of the Walker B motif DxxG. Isomerizes in the presence of ATP.
  - P-loop - This contains the Walker A motif GxxxxGK(S,T). This is the primary ATP binding site.
- Transducer - The seven β-strands that underpin the motor head's structure.
- U50 and L50 - The Upper (U50) and Lower (L50) domains are each around 50kDa. Their spatial separation forms a cleft critical for binding to actin and some regulatory compounds.
- SH1 helix and Relay - These elements together provide an essential mechanism for coupling the enzymatic state of the motor domain to the powerstroke-producing region (converter domain, lever arm, and light chains).
- Converter - This converts a change of conformation in the motor head to an angular displacement of the lever arm (in most cases reinforced with light chains).

==== Myosin VI ====
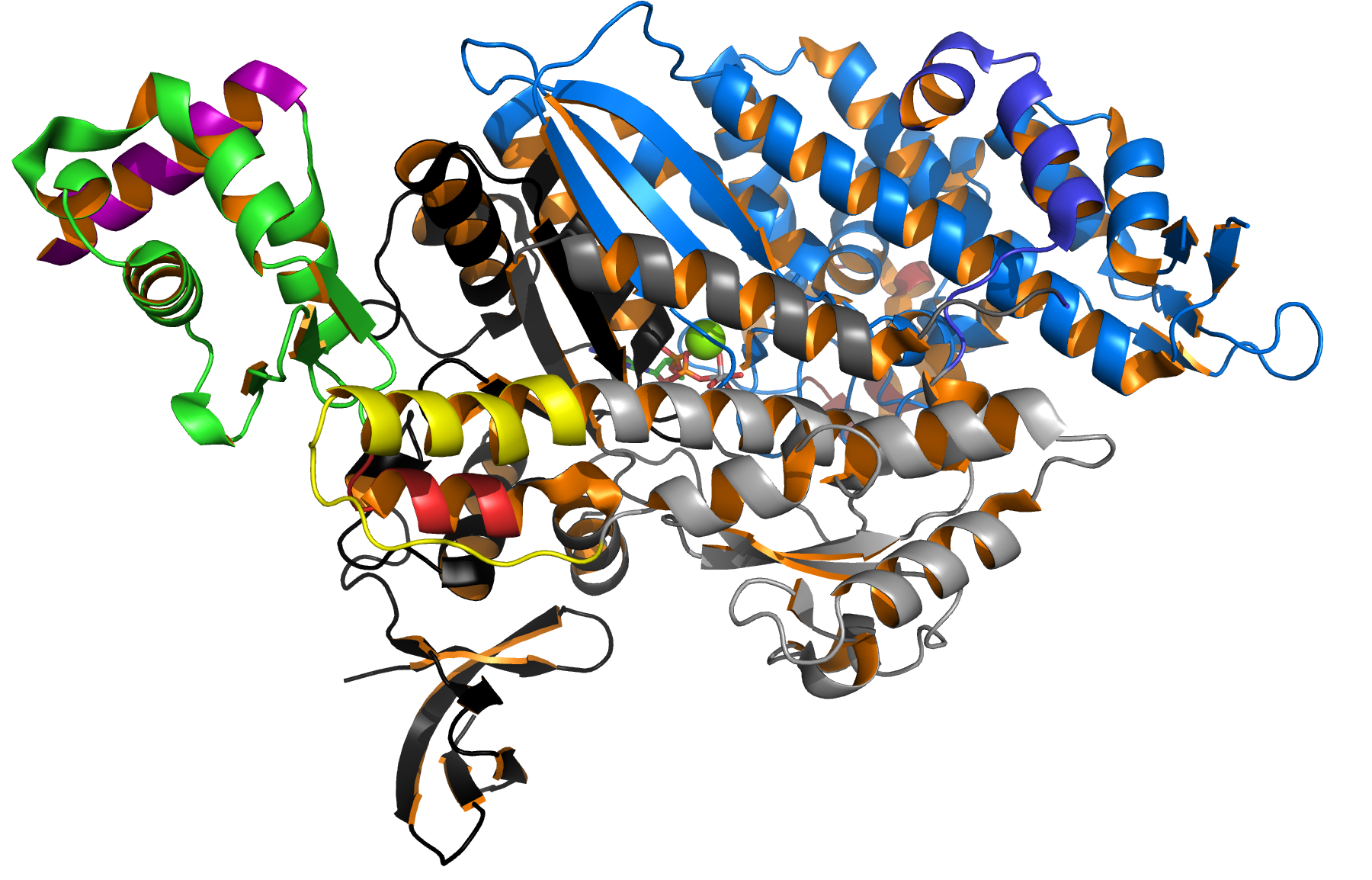
State of myosin VI from PDB 2V26 before the power stroke

Myosin VI is an unconventional myosin motor, which is primarily processive as a dimer, but also acts as a nonprocessive monomer. It walks along actin filaments, travelling towards the pointed end (- end) of the filaments. Myosin VI is thought to transport endocytic vesicles into the cell.

==== Myosin VII ====
Myosin VII is an unconventional myosin with two FERM domains in the tail region. It has an extended lever arm consisting of five calmodulin binding IQ motifs followed by a single alpha helix (SAH) Myosin VII is required for phagocytosis in Dictyostelium discoideum, spermatogenesis in C. elegans and stereocilia formation in mice and zebrafish.

==== Myosin VIII ====
Myosin VIII is a plant-specific myosin linked to cell division; specifically, it is involved in regulating the flow of cytoplasm between cells and in the localization of vesicles to the phragmoplast.

==== Myosin IX ====
Myosin IX is a group of single-headed motor proteins. It was first shown to be minus-end directed, but a later study showed that it is plus-end directed. The movement mechanism for this myosin is poorly understood.

==== Myosin X ====
Myosin X is an unconventional myosin motor, which is functional as a dimer. The dimerization of myosin X is thought to be antiparallel. This behavior has not been observed in other myosins. In mammalian cells, the motor is found to localize to filopodia. Myosin X walks towards the barbed ends of filaments. Some research suggests it preferentially walks on bundles of actin, rather than single filaments. It is the first myosin motor found to exhibit this behavior.

==== Myosin XI ====
Myosin XI directs the movement of organelles such as plastids and mitochondria in plant cells. It is responsible for the light-directed movement of chloroplasts according to light intensity and the formation of stromules interconnecting different plastids. Myosin XI also plays a key role in polar root tip growth and is necessary for proper root hair elongation. A specific Myosin XI found in Nicotiana tabacum was discovered to be the fastest known processive molecular motor, moving at 7 μm/s in 35 nm steps along the actin filament.

==== Myosin XIV ====
This myosin group has been found in the Apicomplexa phylum. The myosins localize to plasma membranes of the intracellular parasites and may then be involved in the cell invasion process.

This myosin is also found in the ciliated protozoan Tetrahymena thermophila. Known functions include: transporting phagosomes to the nucleus and perturbing the developmentally regulated elimination of the macronucleus during conjugation.

==== Myosin XV ====
Myosin XV is necessary for the development of the actin core structure of the non-motile stereocilia located in the inner ear. It is thought to be functional as a monomer.

==== Myosin XVIII ====
MYO18A A gene on chromosome 17q11.2 that encodes actin-based motor molecules with ATPase activity, which may be involved in maintaining stromal cell scaffolding required for maintaining intercellular contact.

==== Myosin XIX ====
Unconventional myosin XIX (Myo19) is a mitochondrial associated myosin motor.

== Genes in humans ==
Note that not all of these genes are active.

- Class I: MYO1A, MYO1B, MYO1C, MYO1D, MYO1E, MYO1F, MYO1G, MYO1H
- Class II: MYH1, MYH2, MYH3, MYH4, MYH6, MYH7, MYH7B, MYH8, MYH9, MYH10, MYH11, MYH13, MYH14, MYH15, MYH16
- Class III: MYO3A, MYO3B
- Class V: MYO5A, MYO5B, MYO5C
- Class VI: MYO6
- Class VII: MYO7A, MYO7B
- Class IX: MYO9A, MYO9B
- Class X: MYO10
- Class XV: MYO15A, MYO15B
- Class XVI: MYO16
- Class XVIII: MYO18A, MYO18B
- Class XIX: MYO19

Myosin light chains are distinct and have their own properties. They are not considered "myosins" but are components of the macromolecular complexes that make up the functional myosin enzymes.

- Light chain: MYL1, MYL2, MYL3, MYL4, MYL5, MYL6, MYL6B, MYL7, MYL9, MYLIP, MYLK, MYLK2, MYLL1

== Paramyosin ==
Paramyosin is a large, 93-115kDa muscle protein that has been described in a number of diverse invertebrate phyla. Invertebrate thick filaments are thought to be composed of an inner paramyosin core surrounded by myosin. The myosin interacts with actin, resulting in fibre contraction. Paramyosin is found in many different invertebrate species, for example, Brachiopoda, Sipunculidea, Nematoda, Annelida, Mollusca, Arachnida, and Insecta. Paramyosin is responsible for the "catch" mechanism that enables sustained contraction of muscles with very little energy expenditure, such that a clam can remain closed for extended periods.

Paramyosins can be found in seafood. A recent computational study showed that following human intestinal digestion, paramyosins of common octopus, Humboldt squid, Japanese abalone, Japanese scallop, Mediterranean mussel, Pacific oyster, sea cucumber, and Whiteleg shrimp could release short peptides that inhibit the enzymatic activities of angiotensin converting enzyme and dipeptidyl peptidase.

== Additional images ==
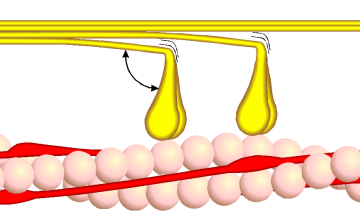
Phase 1

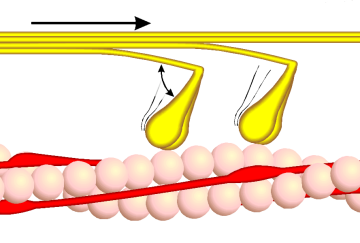
Phase 2

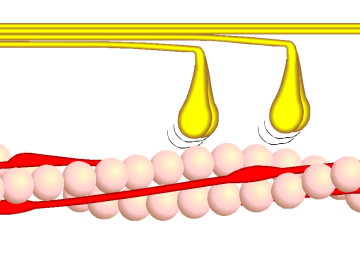
Phase 3

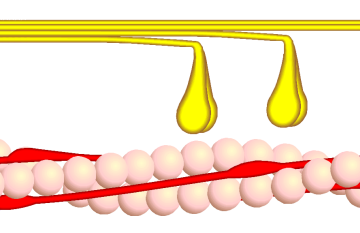
Phase 4
