= MYO10 =

Protein-coding gene in the species Homo sapiens

Identifiers
- Aliases: MYO10, myosin X, MyoX
- External IDs: OMIM: 601481; MGI: 107716; GeneCards: MYO10
Available structures
PDB	Ortholog search: PDBe RCSB
PDB	List of PDB id codes 2LW9, 3AU4, 3AU5, 3PZD

Gene location (Human)
Chr.	Chromosome 5 (human)
Band	5p15.1	Start	16,661,907 bp
Band	5p15.1	End	16,936,288 bp

Gene location (Mouse)
Chr.	Chromosome 15 (mouse)
Band	15 B1|15 9.36 cM	Start	25,622,611 bp
Band	15 B1|15 9.36 cM	End	25,813,759 bp
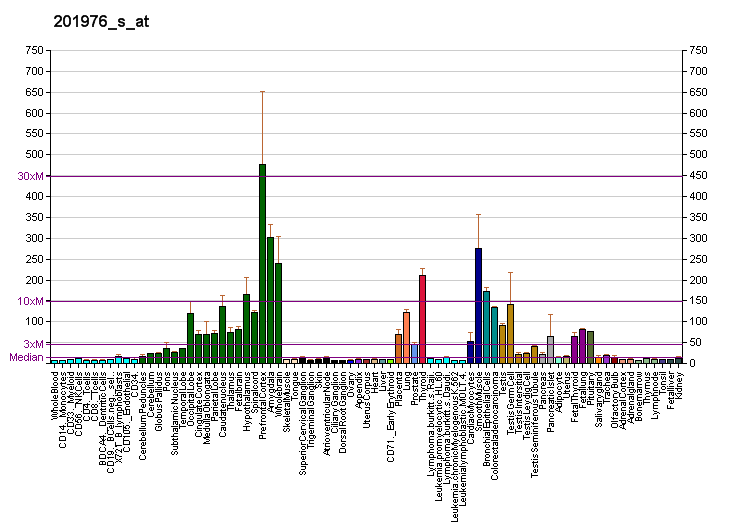

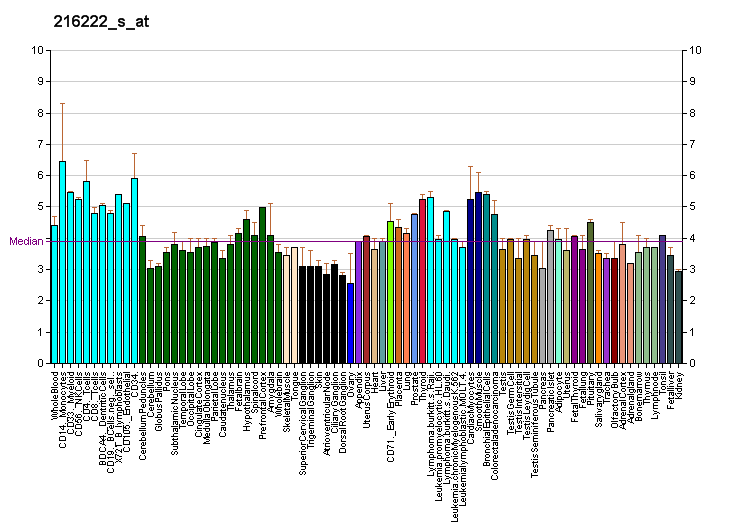
RNA expression pattern
Bgee	Human / Mouse (ortholog); Top expressed in: buccal mucosa cell; internal globus pallidus; external globus pallidus; ventricular zone; dorsal motor nucleus of vagus nerve; inferior olivary nucleus; Region I of hippocampus proper; Epithelium of choroid plexus; middle frontal gyrus; tendon of biceps brachii / Top expressed in: cumulus cell; lateral septal nucleus; body of femur; molar; calvaria; triceps brachii muscle; stroma of bone marrow; epithelium of stomach; zygote; muscle of thigh; More reference expression data
BioGPS	More reference expression data
Gene ontology
Molecular function	nucleotide binding; protein binding; ATP binding; phosphatidylinositol-3,4,5-trisphosphate binding; actin binding; actin filament binding; calmodulin binding; spectrin binding; plus-end directed microfilament motor activity; cytoskeletal motor activity; microtubule motor activity; microtubule binding
Cellular component	nucleolus; cell cortex; myosin complex; ruffle; filopodium membrane; lamellipodium; cytoskeleton; cell projection; membrane; plasma membrane; filopodium tip; cytoplasm; cytosol; filopodium; neuron projection; soma
Biological process	cytoskeleton-dependent intracellular transport; regulation of cell shape; regulation of filopodium assembly; Fc-gamma receptor signaling pathway involved in phagocytosis; signal transduction; positive regulation of cell-cell adhesion; microtubule-based movement
Sources:Amigo / QuickGO
Orthologs
Databases	NCBI: entry; OMA: entry
Species	Human	Mouse
Entrez	4651	17909
Ensembl	ENSG00000145555	ENSMUSG00000022272
UniProt	Q9HD67	F8VQB6
RefSeq (mRNA)	NM_012334	NM_019472; NM_001353141; NM_001353142
RefSeq (protein)	NP_036466	NP_062345; NP_001340070; NP_001340071
Location (UCSC)	Chr 5: 16.66 – 16.94 Mb	Chr 15: 25.62 – 25.81 Mb
PubMed search
- Wikidata
View/Edit Human	View/Edit Mouse

Myosin X, also known as MYO10, is a protein that in humans is encoded by the MYO10 gene.

Myo10 is an actin-based motor protein that can localize to the tips of the finger-like cellular protrusions known as filopodia. Myo10 is broadly expressed in mammalian tissues, although at relatively low levels. Studies with knockout mice demonstrate that Myo10 has important functions in embryonic processes such as neural tube closure and eye development. Myo10 also has important functions in cancer invasion and growth.

Myo10 should not be confused with Myh10, which encodes the heavy chain of the class II myosin known as non-muscle myosin 2b.

== Structure and function ==
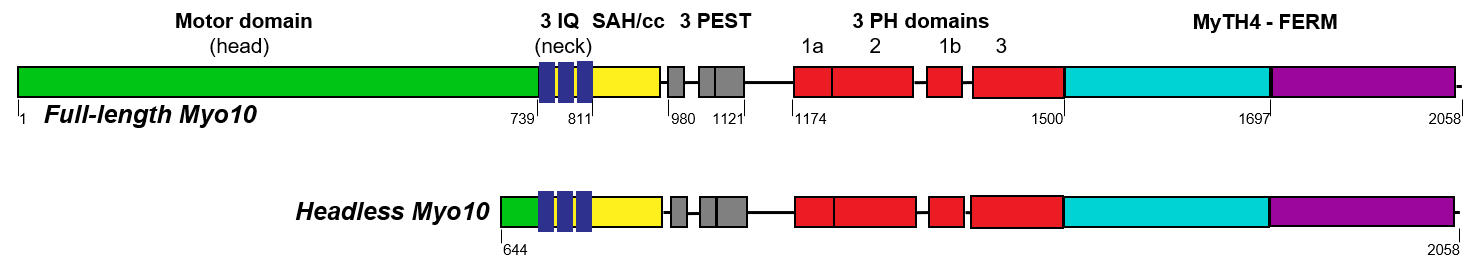
Bar diagram illustrating the domain structures of full-length and headless Myo10 from human. IQ indicates the 3 IQ motifs, each of which binds to a calmodulin or calmodulin-like light chain. The IQ motifs are followed by an alpha-helical region consisting of an N-terminal segment that forms a single stable alpha helix (SAH) and a C-terminal segment that can dimerize by forming an antiparallel coiled coil (CC). See text for additional discussion and references. The approximate positions along the amino acid sequence of the major domains are based on. (Diagram courtesy of Joshua K. Zachariah and Richard E. Cheney)

The human MYO10 gene spans ~274 kb and is located on chromosome 5 band 5p15.1 (GRCh Ensembl release 89). It produces a full-length RNA transcript with 41 exons encoding a MYO10 heavy chain whose deduced sequence has 2058 amino acids and a predicted molecular weight of ~237 kDa. Like many motor proteins, the full-length Myo10 protein can be considered to consist of a head, neck, and tail. The N-terminal head or myosin motor domain can bind to an actin filament, hydrolyze ATP, and produce force. The neck or light chain binding domain consists of 3 IQ motifs, with each IQ motif providing a binding site for one molecule of calmodulin, a ~16.5 kDa calcium-binding protein. Unlike most calmodulin binding sites, which only bind to calmodulin in the presence of calcium, the IQ motifs in Myo10 can bind to calmodulin in the absence of calcium. The Myo10 IQ motifs have also been reported to bind CALML3, a calmodulin-like protein expressed in epithelial cells, so CALML3 may serve as a Myo10 light chain in place of calmodulin in some situations. The Myo10 tail begins with an alpha-helical region whose proximal portion forms a single, stable alpha helix (SAH domain) that lengthens the lever arm formed by the neck domain. The distal portion of the alpha helical region can self-associate with a Kd of ~0.6 uM to form an antiparallel coiled coil, allowing two Myo10 heavy chains to form an antiparallel dimer, a unique structure among known myosins.

A movie of a fluorescence overlay on a Differential Interference Contrast (DIC) of a HeLa S3 (cervical cancer cell line) expressing GFP-Myo10. Cells were transfected overnight with GFP-Myo10 (green) with Lipofectamine 3000 reagent. Myo10 can be seen traveling along the shaft of filopodia and retraction fibers, localizing to their tips and either persisting or retracting into the cell via retrograde flow. (Video courtesy of Gabriel Offenback)

The Myo10 tail includes several regions in addition to the SAH and coiled coil. These include a region with 3 PEST sequences—sequences enriched in the amino acids Proline (P), Glutamine (E), Serine (S), and T (Threonine) that are often associated with cleavage by proteases such as calpain. The Myo10 tail is unique among known myosins in containing 3 PH domains (Pleckstrin Homology domain), a domain often involved in binding to membranes. The sequence of Myo10's first PH domain is somewhat unusual in that it is split by the presence of a surface loop that contains the second PH domain. The second PH domain binds to the important signaling lipid phosphatidylinositol (3,4,5)-trisphosphate [PI(3,4,5)P_{3}] and in some situations has been reported to bind to phosphatidylinositol (4,5)-bisphosphate [PI(4,5)P_{2}]. Myo10's 3 PH domains are thought to work together to recruit it to the plasma membrane. The Myo10 tail ends in a supramodule consisting of a MyTH4 domain (Myosin Tail Homology 4) and a FERM domain (band 4.1, Ezrin, Radixin, Moesin). Myo10's MyTH4 domain can bind to microtubules with a reported affinity of ~0.24 uM and gives full-length Myo10 the important ability to link an actin filament bound by its head to a microtubule bound by its tail. The Myo10 FERM domain can bind to the cytoplasmic domains of several β-integrins, a major class of cell adhesion receptor, and to the cytoplasmic domains of the netrin receptors Deleted in Colorectal Cancer (DCC) and neogenin (Neo1). Although full-length Myo10 protein appears to be expressed at relatively low levels, it can be detected in most mammalian tissues including brain, testes, kidney, lung, stomach, and pancreas.

The native full-length Myo10 heavy chain can exist as a monomer with 3 calmodulin/calmodulin-like light chains or as an antiparallel dimer with 6 calmodulin/calmodulin-like light chains. An antiparallel Myo10 dimer with all 6 light chains would thus have 8 subunits and a native MW of ~574 kDa. Importantly, the tail in a Myo10 monomer can fold back onto the head to inhibit the head's motor activity. Increases in plasma membrane PI(3,4,5)P_{3} levels are hypothesized to recruit Myo10 monomers to the plasma membrane via their PH domains, activating their motor activity and increasing their local concentration, leading to the formation of active antiparallel dimers that are capable moving along actin filaments. Myo10, like all known myosins other than Myo6, moves towards the barbed end of the actin filament. Myo10 is capable of hydrolyzing ~10-20 ATP/s per head and has been reported to generate movement at rates of ~300-1500 nm/s. Single-molecule studies show that native Myo10 dimers can take steps of up to ~55 nm, which are among the largest steps reported for a motor protein. Myo10's large step size is due in part to the long lever arm formed by its neck domain and stable alpha helix, and in part due to the remarkably large swing of ~120° the Myo10 lever arm undergoes during its power stroke. There is much interest in the mechanisms that target Myo10 to filopodial actin bundles, and in Myo10's ability to step from one actin filament in a bundle to another. In addition to the full-length Myo10 described above, the use of alternative transcription start sites located in intron 19-20 of the full-length transcript results in the production of "headless" Myo10 transcripts that lack most of the myosin head domain, but include the rest of the Myo10 heavy chain. The major headless transcripts in human are predicted to include exons 20-41 of full-length MYO10 and initiation of translation at M644 would result in a 1415 amino acid headless protein with a predicted MW of ~163 kDa that would be identical to amino acids 644-2058 of full-length MYO10. Because headless Myo10 lacks most of the head domain, it lacks motor activity, but it retains all of Myo10's other domains and is thus expected to retain the ability to bind to light chains of the calmodulin superfamily, to membranes containing PI(3,4,5)P_{3} or PI(4,5)P_{3}, to microtubules, and to proteins that bind the Myo10 tail such as DCC, neogenin, and β-integrins. Headless Myo10 has been hypothesized to act as a scaffolding protein for its various binding partners and/or as a "natural" dominant negative that can inhibit the actions of full-length Myo10.

== Evolutionary relationships ==
Myo10 is a member of an evolutionarily ancient group of myosins whose tails contain MyTH4-FERM domains and that have been shown to have important functions in cellular protrusions based on actin bundles such as filopodia, microvilli, and inner ear stereocilia. The slime mold Dictyostelium expresses a MyTH4-FERM myosin known as myosin-7 that is involved in filopodia formation and has 2 MyTH4-FERM supramodules but no PH domains. Myo10 appears to have originated from an ancestral myosin-7-like protein approximately a billion years ago by several changes including loss of 1 MyTH4-FERM supramodule and addition of 3 PH domains. A Myo10 gene is present in organisms ranging from filozoans and choanoflagellates (the protozoan groups most closely related to multicellular animals) to humans. Myo10 was lost in the invertebrate lineages leading to organisms such as fruit flies and nematodes, although these lineages do express other MyTH4-FERM myosins such as myosin-7. Humans express 3 MyTH4-FERM myosins in addition to Myo10: MYO7A, the gene that is mutated in Usher syndrome 1b deaf-blindness; MYO7B, a component of an adhesion complex at the tips of microvilli; and MYO15A, a myosin that localizes to the tips of inner ear stereocilia and that is mutated in DFNB3 deafness. The head domains of the other MyTH4-FERM myosins expressed in human exhibit at most 45% overall amino acid sequence identity with Myo10 and their tail domains each contain 2 MyTH4-FERM domains instead of the 3 PH domains and 1 MyTH4-FERM domain in Myo10.

== Cellular function ==
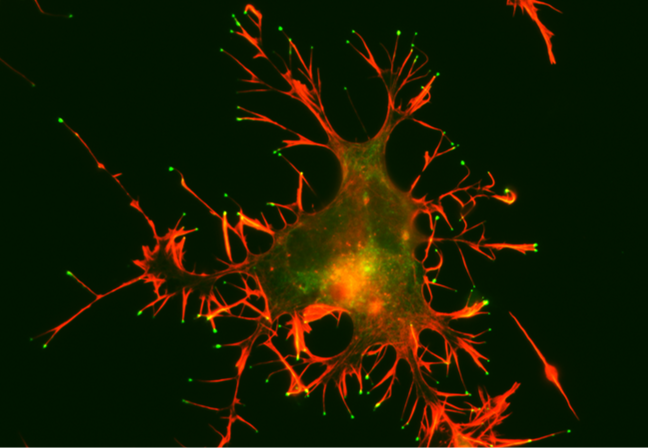
A CAD cell (a neuronal cell line) expressing GFP-Myo10 (green) was stained for actin filaments (red) to visualize the slender cellular protrusions known as filopodia. Overexpressing Myo10 induces large numbers of filopodia and is responsible for the unusually large number of filopodia on this cell. (Image courtesy of Aurea D. Sousa and Richard E. Cheney)

Myo10 can localize to the tips of filopodia, a property most other myosins lack. When Myo10 was tagged with Green Fluorescent Protein (GFP) and expressed in cells, small puncta of GFP-Myo10 were observed moving forward within filopodia towards the tip at rates of ~100 nm/s. Imaging with single-molecule sensitivity revealed similar movements of individual Myo10 dimers at rates of ~600-1400 nm/s. GFP-Myo10 also moves rearward in filopodia at retrograde flow rates of ~15 nm/s. These observations led to the hypothesis that Myo10 molecules use their motor activity to move themselves rapidly forward along filopodial actin filaments and can bind to filopodial actin filaments to be carried slowly rearward by retrograde actin flow. This "intrafilopodial motility" of Myo10 has led to suggestions that Myo10 functions as a motor protein for transporting cargos within filopodia. Myo10 also has important functions in the formation and/or stabilization of filopodia, with Myo10 overexpression increasing the number and length of filopodia, while knockdown or knockout of Myo10 decreases filopodia. Myo10 also has important functions in cell division, particularly in mitotic spindle orientation. Myo10 is also required to cluster the excess centrosomes that are a hallmark of cancer cells, a process of great interest because cancer cells need to cluster their centrosomes to successfully divide.

== Role in disease ==
Growing evidence demonstrates that Myo10 has important roles in cancer. In addition to its role in clustering the excess centrosomes of cancer cells, Myo10 is a key component of invadopodia, filopodia-related protrusions that cancer cells use to invade their surroundings. Several microRNAs that suppress cancer cell invasion have also been reported to act in part by targeting the Myo10 mRNA. Knockout or knockdown of Myo10 is reported to suppress cancer cell invasion or spread in experimental models of breast cancer, lung cancer, and glioma, where knockout of Myo10 also increased the effectiveness of an otherwise ineffective chemotherapy agent. These results, plus research showing that knockout of Myo10 increased survival time by 260% in a mouse model of melanoma, make Myo10 a potential anti-cancer target.
