= Unconventional myosin-VI =

Protein found in humans

MYO6
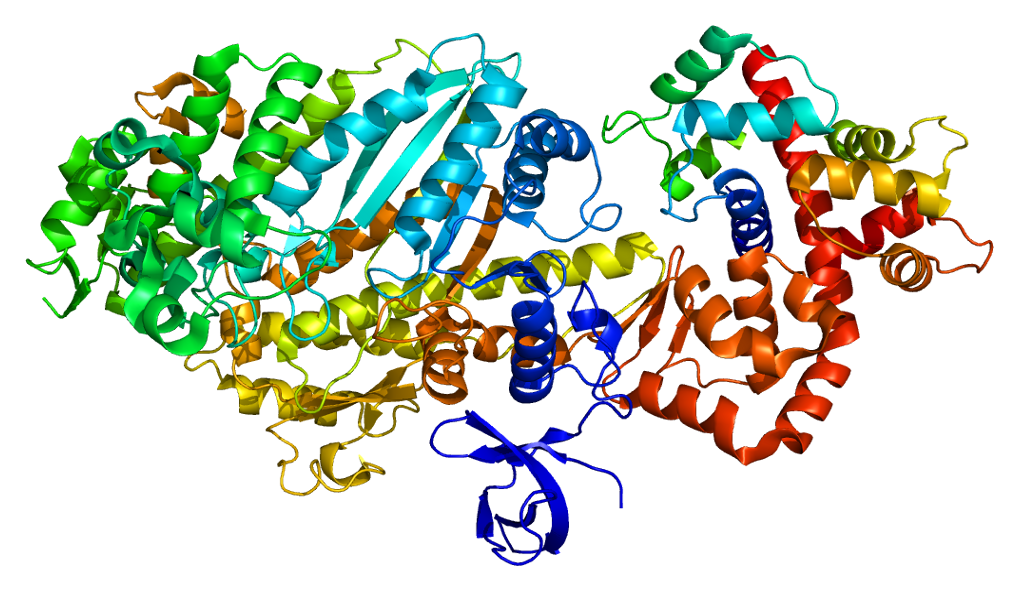

Identifiers
- Aliases: MYO6, DFNA22, DFNB37, myosin VI, Myo6-008, Myo6-007
- External IDs: OMIM: 600970; MGI: 104785; GeneCards: MYO6
Available structures
PDB	Ortholog search: PDBe RCSB
PDB	List of PDB id codes 2N11, 2N13, 2N0Z, 2N10, 2N12

Gene location (Human)
Chr.	Chromosome 6 (human)
Band	6q14.1	Start	75,749,201 bp
Band	6q14.1	End	75,919,537 bp

Gene location (Mouse)
Chr.	Chromosome 9 (mouse)
Band	9 E1|9 43.98 cM	Start	80,072,313 bp
Band	9 E1|9 43.98 cM	End	80,219,011 bp
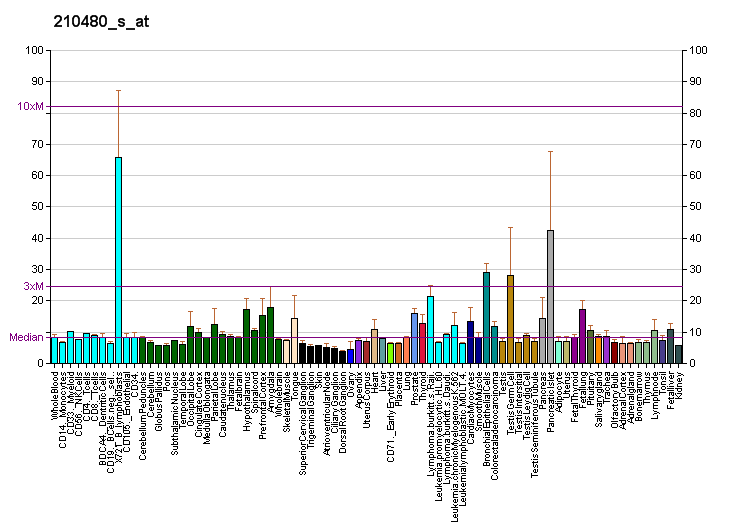

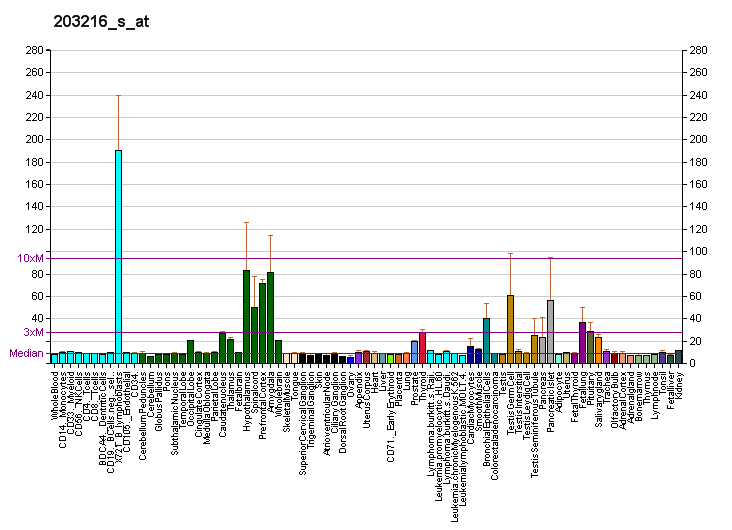

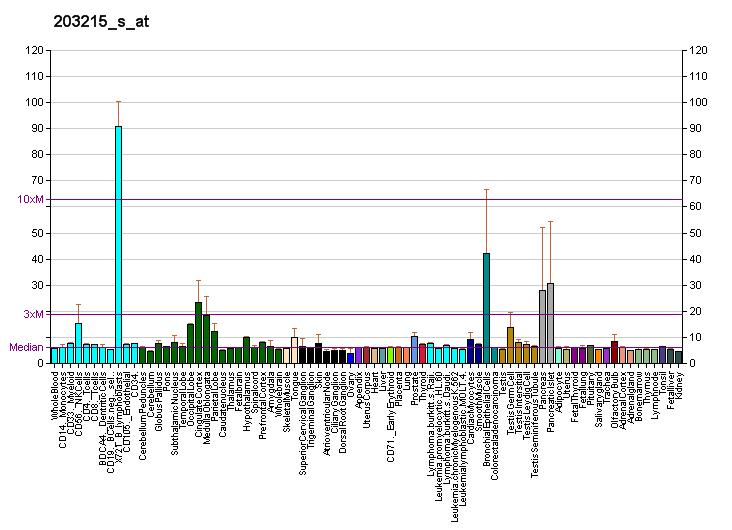
RNA expression pattern
Bgee	Human / Mouse (ortholog); Top expressed in: amniotic fluid; internal globus pallidus; corpus callosum; sural nerve; external globus pallidus; pancreatic ductal cell; inferior ganglion of vagus nerve; pars reticulata; subthalamic nucleus; renal medulla / Top expressed in: olfactory epithelium; neural layer of retina; yolk sac; right kidney; human kidney; utricle; epithelium of small intestine; ileum; Ileal epithelium; vestibular sensory epithelium; More reference expression data
BioGPS	More reference expression data
Gene ontology
Molecular function	cytoskeletal motor activity; actin filament binding; ATP binding; calmodulin binding; protein binding; minus-end directed microfilament motor activity; ADP binding; actin binding; nucleotide binding; cadherin binding; identical protein binding
Cellular component	myosin complex; nucleus; intracellular membrane-bounded organelle; cell projection; ruffle membrane; RNA polymerase II, holoenzyme; nucleoplasm; lysosomal membrane; perinuclear region of cytoplasm; clathrin-coated endocytic vesicle; apical part of cell; clathrin-coated vesicle membrane; ruffle; cytosol; extracellular exosome; membrane; clathrin-coated pit; filamentous actin; plasma membrane; nuclear membrane; cytoplasm; cell cortex; microvillus; Golgi apparatus; unconventional myosin complex; endocytic vesicle; cytoplasmic vesicle; actin filament; protein-containing complex; clathrin-coated vesicle; filopodium
Biological process	intracellular protein transport; actin filament-based movement; regulation of secretion; hearing; positive regulation of transcription by RNA polymerase II; protein transport; endocytosis; DNA damage response, signal transduction by p53 class mediator; transport
Sources:Amigo / QuickGO
Orthologs
Databases	NCBI: entry; OMA: entry
Species	Human	Mouse
Entrez	4646	17920
Ensembl	ENSG00000196586	ENSMUSG00000033577
UniProt	Q9UM54	Q64331
RefSeq (mRNA)	NM_001300899; NM_004999; NM_001368136; NM_001368137; NM_001368138 NM_001368139; NM_001368140; NM_001368865; NM_001368866	NM_001039546; NM_008662
RefSeq (protein)	NP_001287828; NP_004990; NP_001355065; NP_001355066; NP_001355067 NP_001355068; NP_001355069; NP_001355794; NP_001355795	n/a
Location (UCSC)	Chr 6: 75.75 – 75.92 Mb	Chr 9: 80.07 – 80.22 Mb
PubMed search
- Wikidata
View/Edit Human	View/Edit Mouse

Unconventional myosin-VI, is a protein that in humans is coded for by MYO6. Unconventional myosin-VI is a myosin molecular motor involved in intracellular vesicle and organelle transport.

== Structure ==
Human myosin-VI contains a N-terminal myosin head domain (residues 59–759), two coiled coil motifs (residues 902–984 and 986–1009 respectively), and a C-terminal myosin VI cargo binding domain (residues 1177–1267).

== Function ==
Unconventional myosin-VI is unique because it travels in the opposite direction of other myosins, towards the negative end of actin filaments. Myosin-VI follows the same structure as other myosin but with two unique "inserts" allowing for its diversified properties. One insert is called the "reverse gear" and is responsible for its movement towards the negative end of actin filaments. The reverse gear is located on the neck region of the myosin and acts as a reorienting device for the lever arm to move backwards after myosin movement. The second insert assists in regulating ATP enzyme activity located in the motor head domain.

There are 3 amino acid binding sites essential for myosin-VI's interactions, Arg-Arg-Leu and Trp-Trp-Tyr in the tail region and Met-Ile-Sec in the helix. The Arg-Arg-Leu amino acid segment (abbreviated RRL) takes part in ubiquitin interactions while Trp-Trp-Tyr (abbreviated WWY) assists in interactions with DAB2. Myosin-VI's Met-Ile-Sec bonding interactions are limited to the myosin-VI long isoform but interact with clathrin in endocytosis.

Myosin-VI long isoform is formed by the inclusion of exon 31, adding an addition alpha-helix, restriction RRL interactions. Myosin-VI long struggles to interact with ubiquitin chains and GIPC1 due to this structural formation, however, increases attractivity to clathrin. Myosin-VI's structural flexibility provides a great width in interaction ability with its environment and interactors.

== Interactions ==
MYO6 has been shown to interact with GIPC1, DAB2., ubiquitin, and clathrin. Myosin VI, being a motor protein, focuses its interactions by moving along actin filaments. This however does not limit its functions, because MYO6 is heavily involved in cytokinesis, creation of membrane compartments, and the regulation and organization of actin filaments.

== Clinical significance ==
Mutations in the MYO6 gene are associated with hearing loss. MYO6 has also been found to be involved in many events in spermiogenesis in numerous different creatures. In common fruit flies (Drosophila), the myosin-VI ortholog controls the sterility of males by organization of actin involved in spermatid individualization. This same ortholog in roundworms (C. elegans) regulates the separation of cytosol in spermatid formation due to its influence in cytokinesis. In mice, this ortholog will control specialization and membrane compartment creation.
