= MYO1C =

Protein-coding gene in the species Homo sapiens

Identifiers
- Aliases: MYO1C, MMI-beta, MMIb, NMI, myr2, myosin IC, MyoIC
- External IDs: OMIM: 606538; MGI: 106612; GeneCards: MYO1C
Available structures
PDB	Ortholog search: PDBe RCSB
PDB	List of PDB id codes 4BYF

Gene location (Human)
Chr.	Chromosome 17 (human)
Band	17p13.3	Start	1,464,186 bp
Band	17p13.3	End	1,492,686 bp

Gene location (Mouse)
Chr.	Chromosome 11 (mouse)
Band	11 B5|11 45.92 cM	Start	75,541,330 bp
Band	11 B5|11 45.92 cM	End	75,564,736 bp
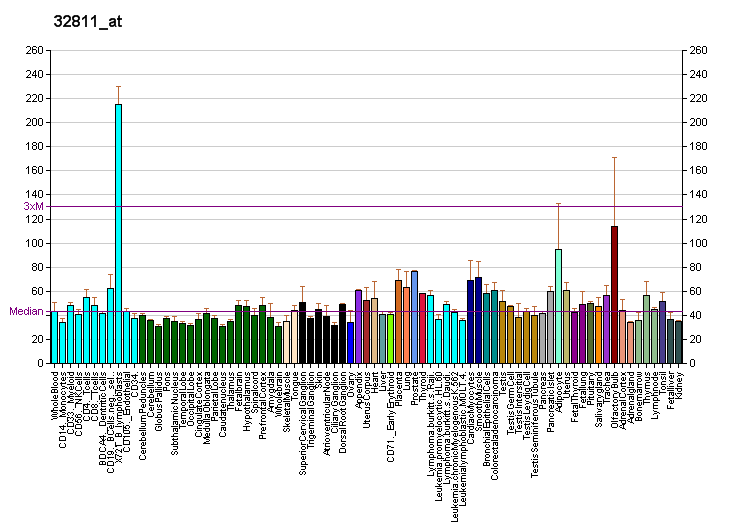

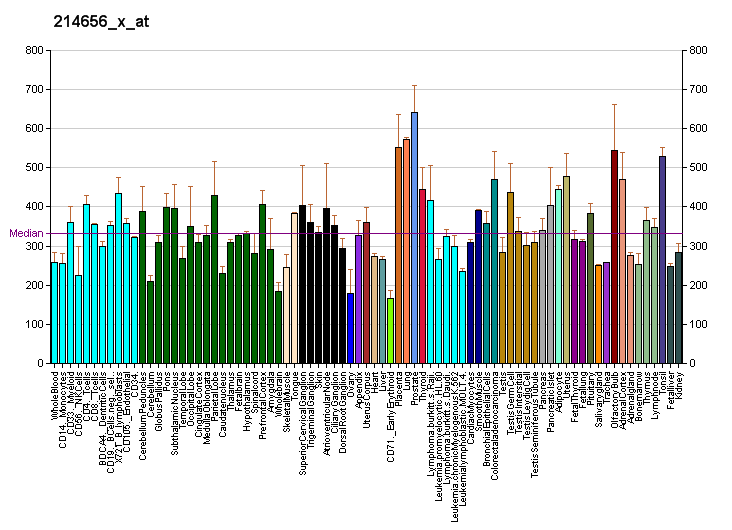
RNA expression pattern
Bgee	Human / Mouse (ortholog); Top expressed in: right lung; tibial nerve; subcutaneous adipose tissue; popliteal artery; tibial arteries; gastric mucosa; buccal mucosa cell; right coronary artery; sural nerve; abdominal fat / Top expressed in: right lung; right lung lobe; left lung; submandibular gland; lacrimal gland; parotid gland; tunica media of zone of aorta; left lung lobe; ascending aorta; endothelial cell of lymphatic vessel; More reference expression data
BioGPS	More reference expression data
Gene ontology
Molecular function	protein C-terminus binding; nucleotide binding; actin binding; signaling receptor binding; cytoskeletal motor activity; calmodulin binding; ATP binding; protein binding; microfilament motor activity; actin filament binding; microtubule motor activity; microtubule binding
Cellular component	extracellular exosome; filamentous actin; brush border; nucleolus; cytoplasm; nuclear pore; cell projection; cytosol; nucleus; stress fiber; stereocilium; unconventional myosin complex; microvillus; basal plasma membrane; membrane; myosin I complex; ruffle; membrane raft; plasma membrane; myosin complex; cytoplasmic vesicle; stereocilium membrane; lateral plasma membrane; ruffle membrane; nucleoplasm; nuclear body; stereocilium bundle; cytoplasmic vesicle membrane; phagocytic vesicle
Biological process	Fc-gamma receptor signaling pathway involved in phagocytosis; positive regulation of protein targeting to membrane; positive regulation of cell migration by vascular endothelial growth factor signaling pathway; epigenetic maintenance of chromatin in transcription-competent conformation; positive regulation of cell migration; protein targeting; regulation of bicellular tight junction assembly; protein transport; protein targeting to membrane; mRNA transport; positive regulation of vascular endothelial growth factor signaling pathway; positive regulation of cellular response to insulin stimulus; positive regulation of actin filament polymerization; transport; vesicle transport along actin filament; cellular response to interferon-gamma; microtubule-based movement
Sources:Amigo / QuickGO
Orthologs
Databases	NCBI: entry; OMA: entry
Species	Human	Mouse
Entrez	4641	17913
Ensembl	ENSG00000197879	ENSMUSG00000017774
UniProt	O00159	Q9WTI7
RefSeq (mRNA)	NM_033375; NM_001080779; NM_001080950; NM_001363855	NM_001080774; NM_001080775; NM_008659; NM_001370611
RefSeq (protein)	NP_001074248; NP_001074419; NP_203693; NP_001350784	NP_001074243; NP_001074244; NP_032685; NP_001357540
Location (UCSC)	Chr 17: 1.46 – 1.49 Mb	Chr 11: 75.54 – 75.56 Mb
PubMed search
- Wikidata
View/Edit Human	View/Edit Mouse

Myosin-Ic is a protein that in humans is encoded by the MYO1C gene.

This gene encodes a member of the unconventional myosin protein family, which are actin-based molecular motors. The protein is found in the cytoplasm, and one isoform with a unique N-terminus is also found in the nucleus. The nuclear isoform associates with RNA polymerase I and II and functions in transcription initiation. The mouse ortholog of this protein also functions in intracellular vesicle transport to the plasma membrane. Multiple transcript variants encoding different isoforms have been found for this gene. The related gene myosin IE has been referred to as myosin IC in the literature, but it is a distinct locus on chromosome 19.
