= MYO1G =

Protein-coding gene in the species Homo sapiens

Identifiers
- Aliases: MYO1G, HA2, HLA-HA2, MHAG, myosin IG
- External IDs: OMIM: 600642; MGI: 1927091; GeneCards: MYO1G

Gene location (Human)
Chr.	Chromosome 7 (human)
Band	7p13	Start	44,962,662 bp
Band	7p13	End	44,979,088 bp

Gene location (Mouse)
Chr.	Chromosome 11 (mouse)
Band	11|11 A1	Start	6,456,548 bp
Band	11|11 A1	End	6,470,965 bp
RNA expression pattern
Bgee	Human / Mouse (ortholog); Top expressed in: granulocyte; monocyte; thymus; blood; lymph node; cecum; appendix; spleen; pylorus; bone marrow cell / Top expressed in: granulocyte; lymph node; mesenteric lymph nodes; spleen; tibiofemoral joint; thymus; bone marrow; blood; stroma of bone marrow; subcutaneous adipose tissue; More reference expression data
BioGPS	n/a
Gene ontology
Molecular function	nucleotide binding; calmodulin binding; phosphatidylinositol-3,4-bisphosphate binding; actin binding; phosphatidylinositol-4,5-bisphosphate binding; cytoskeletal motor activity; ATP binding; phosphatidylinositol-3,4,5-trisphosphate binding; lipid binding
Cellular component	cell projection; membrane; filopodium; plasma membrane; microvillus; phagocytic cup; extracellular exosome; leading edge membrane; myosin complex; lamellipodium
Biological process	T cell migration; T cell mediated immunity; adaptive immune response; Fc-gamma receptor signaling pathway involved in phagocytosis; cell gliding; immune system process; cell-substrate adhesion; phagocytosis; exocytosis; T cell meandering migration
Sources:Amigo / QuickGO
Orthologs
Databases	NCBI: entry; OMA: entry
Species	Human	Mouse
Entrez	64005	246177
Ensembl	ENSG00000136286	ENSMUSG00000020437
UniProt	B0I1T2	Q5SUA5
RefSeq (mRNA)	NM_033054	NM_178440
RefSeq (protein)	NP_149043	NP_848534
Location (UCSC)	Chr 7: 44.96 – 44.98 Mb	Chr 11: 6.46 – 6.47 Mb
PubMed search
- Wikidata
View/Edit Human	View/Edit Mouse

Myosin IG, also known as myosin 1G and MYO1G, is a protein that in humans is encoded by the MYO1G gene. MYO1G is a member of class I unconventional myosins. Its expression is highly restricted to hematopoietic tissues and cells. It localises exclusively to the plasma membrane and is dependent on both the motor domain and the tail domain. MYO1G regulates cell elasticity possibly by interaction plasma membrane and cortical actin in Jurkat T-cells.

== Function ==
MYO1G is a plasma membrane-associated class I myosin (see MIM 601478) that is abundant in T and B lymphocytes and mast cells (Pierce et al., 2001 [PubMed 11544309]; Patino-Lopez et al., 2010 [PubMed 20071333]).[supplied by OMIM, Jun 2010].
