= MYO16 =

Protein-coding gene in humans

Identifiers
- Aliases: MYO16, MYAP3, MYR8, Myo16b, NYAP3, PPP1R107, myosin XVI
- External IDs: OMIM: 615479; MGI: 2685951; GeneCards: MYO16

Gene location (Human)
Chr.	Chromosome 13 (human)
Band	13q33.3	Start	108,596,152 bp
Band	13q33.3	End	109,208,005 bp

Gene location (Mouse)
Chr.	Chromosome 8 (mouse)
Band	8|8 A1.1	Start	10,203,911 bp
Band	8|8 A1.1	End	10,684,742 bp
RNA expression pattern
Bgee	Human / Mouse (ortholog); Top expressed in: testicle; gonad; entorhinal cortex; middle temporal gyrus; Brodmann area 23; ganglionic eminence; right ventricle; primary visual cortex; Brodmann area 10; orbitofrontal cortex / Top expressed in: habenula; primary oocyte; lumbar subsegment of spinal cord; olfactory bulb; zygote; secondary oocyte; Epithelium of choroid plexus; dentate gyrus of hippocampal formation granule cell; embryo; olfactory tubercle; More reference expression data
BioGPS	n/a
Gene ontology
Molecular function	nucleotide binding; actin filament binding; actin binding; cytoskeletal motor activity; ATP binding; protein binding
Cellular component	cytoplasm; perinuclear region of cytoplasm; plasma membrane; myosin complex; nucleoplasm
Biological process	negative regulation of G1/S transition of mitotic cell cycle; cerebellum development; negative regulation of cell population proliferation
Sources:Amigo / QuickGO
Orthologs
Databases	NCBI: entry; OMA: entry
Species	Human	Mouse
Entrez	23026	244281
Ensembl	ENSG00000041515	ENSMUSG00000039057
UniProt	Q9Y6X6	Q5DU14
RefSeq (mRNA)	NM_001198950; NM_015011	NM_001081397; NM_001319151
RefSeq (protein)	NP_001185879; NP_055826	NP_001306080
Location (UCSC)	Chr 13: 108.6 – 109.21 Mb	Chr 8: 10.2 – 10.68 Mb
PubMed search
- Wikidata
View/Edit Human	View/Edit Mouse

Unconventional myosin-XVI is a protein that in humans is encoded by the MYO16 gene. Myosin XVI is an unconventional myosin motor protein implicated in schizophrenia and prostate cancer.
