= MYH1 =

Protein-coding gene in the species Homo sapiens

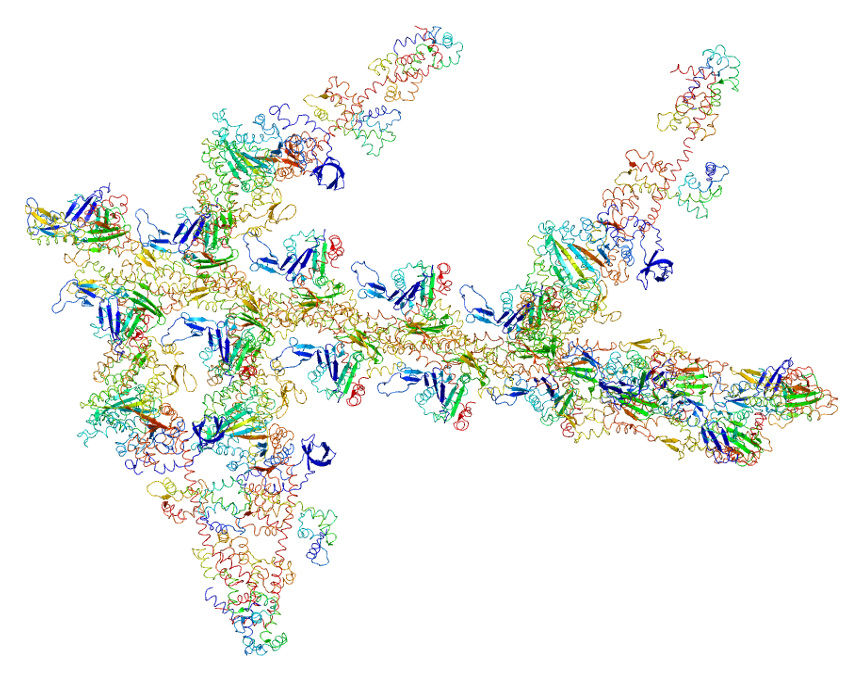

Identifiers
- Aliases: MYH1, HEL71, MYHSA1, MYHa, MyHC-2X/D, MyHC-2x, myosin, heavy chain 1, skeletal muscle, adult, myosin heavy chain 1
- External IDs: OMIM: 160730; MGI: 1339711; GeneCards: MYH1

Gene location (Human)
Chr.	Chromosome 17 (human)
Band	17p13.1	Start	10,492,307 bp
Band	17p13.1	End	10,518,542 bp

Gene location (Mouse)
Chr.	Chromosome 11 (mouse)
Band	11 B3|11 40.59 cM	Start	67,090,878 bp
Band	11 B3|11 40.59 cM	End	67,115,401 bp
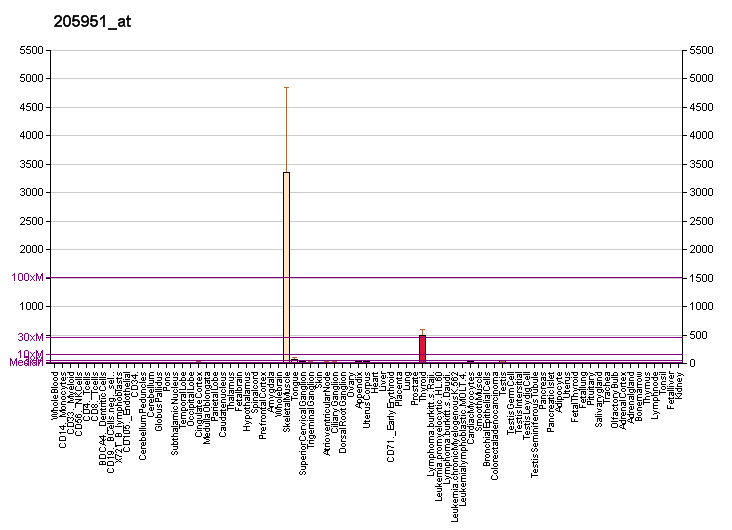
RNA expression pattern
Bgee	Human / Mouse (ortholog); Top expressed in: Skeletal muscle tissue of rectus abdominis; biceps brachii; vastus lateralis muscle; Skeletal muscle tissue of biceps brachii; muscle of thigh; thoracic diaphragm; gastrocnemius muscle; deltoid muscle; triceps brachii muscle; larynx / Top expressed in: masseter muscle; digastric muscle; intercostal muscle; extraocular muscle; ankle; temporal muscle; tibialis anterior muscle; vastus lateralis muscle; sternocleidomastoid muscle; body of femur; More reference expression data
BioGPS	More reference expression data
Gene ontology
Molecular function	nucleotide binding; actin binding; cytoskeletal motor activity; protein binding; ATP binding; calmodulin binding; actin filament binding; microtubule motor activity; microtubule binding
Cellular component	cytoplasm; myosin filament; cytoplasmic ribonucleoprotein granule; myofibril; myosin complex; muscle myosin complex; intercalated disc; A band
Biological process	microtubule-based movement; muscle contraction
Sources:Amigo / QuickGO
Orthologs
Databases	NCBI: entry; OMA: entry
Species	Human	Mouse
Entrez	4619	17879
Ensembl	ENSG00000109061	ENSMUSG00000056328
UniProt	P12882	Q5SX40
RefSeq (mRNA)	NM_005963	NM_030679
RefSeq (protein)	NP_005954	NP_109604
Location (UCSC)	Chr 17: 10.49 – 10.52 Mb	Chr 11: 67.09 – 67.12 Mb
PubMed search
- Wikidata
View/Edit Human	View/Edit Mouse

Myosin-1, also known as 'striated muscle myosin heavy chain 1', is a protein that in humans is encoded by the MYH1 gene. This gene is most highly expressed in fast type IIX/D muscle fibres of vertebrates and encodes a protein found uniquely in striated muscle; it is a class II myosin with a long coiled coil tail that dimerizes and should not be confused with 'Myosin 1' encoded by the MYO1 family of genes (MYO1A-MYO1H). Class I MYO1 genes function in many cell types throughout biology and are single-headed membrane-binding myosins that lack a long coiled coil tail.

== Function ==
Myosin is a major contractile protein that converts chemical energy into mechanical energy through the hydrolysis of ATP. Class II Myosins are hexameric proteins composed of a pair of myosin heavy chains (MYH) and two pairs of nonidentical light chains. Myosin heavy chains are encoded by a multigene family. In mammals, at least ten different myosin heavy chain (MYH) isoforms have been described from striated, smooth, but rarely in non-muscle cells. These isoforms show expression that is spatially and temporally regulated during development.
