= Unconventional myosin-Ia =

Protein-coding gene in the species Homo sapiens

MYO1A

Identifiers
- Aliases: MYO1A, BBMI, DFNA48, MIHC, MYHL, myosin IA
- External IDs: OMIM: 601478; MGI: 107732; GeneCards: MYO1A

Gene location (Human)
Chr.	Chromosome 12 (human)
Band	12q13.3	Start	57,028,517 bp
Band	12q13.3	End	57,051,198 bp

Gene location (Mouse)
Chr.	Chromosome 10 (mouse)
Band	10 D3|10 74.62 cM	Start	127,541,039 bp
Band	10 D3|10 74.62 cM	End	127,556,809 bp
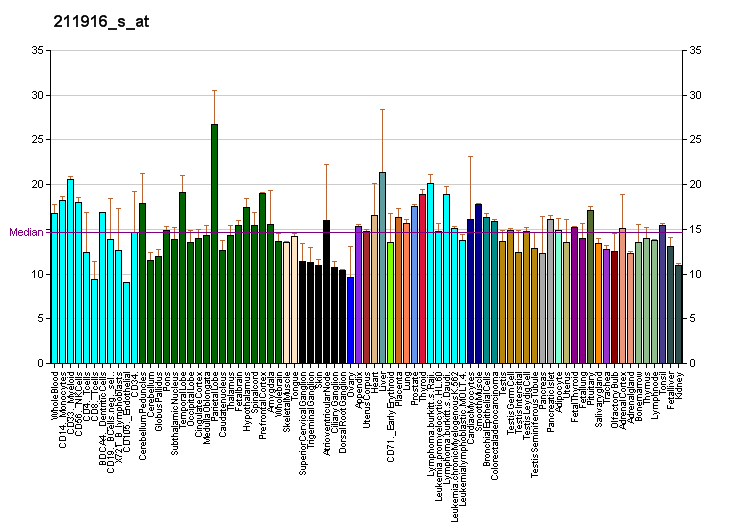
RNA expression pattern
Bgee	Human / Mouse (ortholog); Top expressed in: jejunal mucosa; mucosa of transverse colon; mucosa of ileum; rectum; duodenum; mucosa of sigmoid colon; epithelium of colon; C1 segment; body of stomach; testicle / Top expressed in: jejunum; duodenum; colon; ileum; left colon; epithelium of small intestine; epithelium of stomach; lumbar spinal ganglion; Paneth cell; spermatocyte; More reference expression data
BioGPS	More reference expression data
Gene ontology
Molecular function	nucleotide binding; actin binding; actin filament binding; cytoskeletal motor activity; calmodulin binding; ATP binding; microtubule motor activity; microtubule binding
Cellular component	filamentous actin; brush border; cytoplasm; cortical actin cytoskeleton; microvillus; apical plasma membrane; basal plasma membrane; plasma membrane raft; myosin complex; basolateral plasma membrane; lateral plasma membrane
Biological process	hearing; microvillus assembly; cell projection organization; vesicle localization; microtubule-based movement
Sources:Amigo / QuickGO
Orthologs
Databases	NCBI: entry; OMA: entry
Species	Human	Mouse
Entrez	4640	432516
Ensembl	ENSG00000166866	ENSMUSG00000025401
UniProt	Q9UBC5	O88329
RefSeq (mRNA)	NM_001256041; NM_005379	NM_001081219
RefSeq (protein)	NP_001242970; NP_005370	NP_001074688
Location (UCSC)	Chr 12: 57.03 – 57.05 Mb	Chr 10: 127.54 – 127.56 Mb
PubMed search
- Wikidata
View/Edit Human	View/Edit Mouse

Unconventional myosin-Ia is a protein that in humans is encoded by the MYO1A gene.

The protein encoded by this gene belongs to the myosin superfamily. Myosins are molecular motors that, upon interaction with actin filaments, utilize energy from ATP hydrolysis to generate mechanical force. Each myosin has a conserved N-terminal motor domain that contains both ATP-binding and actin-binding sequences. Following the motor domain is a light-chain-binding 'neck' region containing 1-6 copies of a repeat element, the IQ motif, that serves as a binding site for calmodulin or other members of the EF-hand superfamily of calcium-binding proteins. At the C-terminus, each myosin class has a distinct tail domain that serves in dimerization, membrane binding, protein binding, and/or enzymatic activities and targets each myosin to its particular subcellular location. The myosin-Ia protein is expressed by enterocytes, the epithelial cells that line the luminal surface of the small intestine. In these cells the myosin-1a protein localizes specifically to the brush border. Experiments indicate that the brush border population of the encoded protein turns over rapidly, while its head and tail domains interact transiently with the core actin and plasma membrane, respectively. A rapidly exchanging pool of the unconventional myosin-Ia protein binds to the actin core bundle, which turns over on a much slower timescale.
