= MYO19 =

Protein-coding gene in humans

Identifiers
- Aliases: MYO19, MYOHD1, myosin XIX
- External IDs: OMIM: 617379; MGI: 1913446; GeneCards: MYO19

Gene location (Human)
Chr.	Chromosome 17 (human)
Band	17q12	Start	36,495,636 bp
Band	17q12	End	36,543,435 bp

Gene location (Mouse)
Chr.	Chromosome 11 (mouse)
Band	11|11 C	Start	84,770,974 bp
Band	11|11 C	End	84,802,052 bp
RNA expression pattern
Bgee	Human / Mouse (ortholog); Top expressed in: skin of leg; skin of abdomen; right testis; left testis; minor salivary glands; rectum; mucosa of transverse colon; right uterine tube; body of stomach; skin of arm / Top expressed in: Jacobson's organ; clavicle; molar; gallbladder; zygote; secondary oocyte; tail of embryo; Meckel's cartilage; genital tubercle; primary oocyte; More reference expression data
BioGPS	n/a
Gene ontology
Molecular function	myosin light chain binding; plus-end directed microfilament motor activity; nucleotide binding; cytoskeletal motor activity; ATP binding; actin binding; ATPase activity; microtubule motor activity; microtubule binding
Cellular component	membrane; cytoskeleton; myosin complex; cytoplasm; mitochondrion; mitochondrial outer membrane; cytosol
Biological process	regulation of cytokinesis; regulation of mitochondrial fission; mitochondrion migration along actin filament; microtubule-based movement
Sources:Amigo / QuickGO
Orthologs
Databases	NCBI: entry; OMA: entry
Species	Human	Mouse
Entrez	80179	66196
Ensembl	ENSG00000278372; ENSG00000278259	ENSMUSG00000020527
UniProt	Q96H55	Q5SV80
RefSeq (mRNA)	NM_001033579; NM_001033580; NM_001163735; NM_025109	NM_025414; NM_001362893
RefSeq (protein)	NP_001028752; NP_001157207; NP_079385	NP_079690; NP_001349822
Location (UCSC)	Chr 17: 36.5 – 36.54 Mb	Chr 11: 84.77 – 84.8 Mb
PubMed search
- Wikidata
View/Edit Human	View/Edit Mouse

Unconventional myosin-XIX is a protein that in humans is encoded by the MYO19 gene. Myosin XIX is an unconventional myosin motor protein that participates in cytokinesis and mitochondrial fission.
