= Myosin-11 =

Protein-coding gene in the species Homo sapiens

MYH11
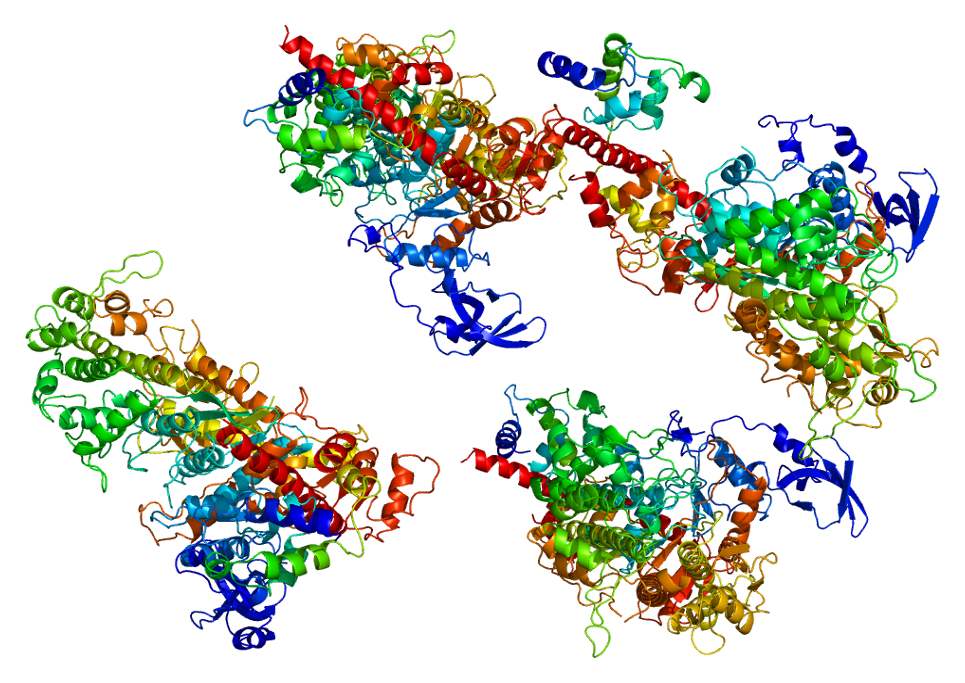

Identifiers
- Aliases: MYH11, AAT4, FAA4, SMHC, SMMHC, myosin, heavy chain 11, smooth muscle, myosin heavy chain 11, VSCM2, SMMS-1
- External IDs: OMIM: 160745; MGI: 102643; GeneCards: MYH11

Gene location (Human)
Chr.	Chromosome 16 (human)
Band	16p13.11	Start	15,703,135 bp
Band	16p13.11	End	15,857,028 bp

Gene location (Mouse)
Chr.	Chromosome 16 (mouse)
Band	16 A1|16 9.71 cM	Start	14,012,399 bp
Band	16 A1|16 9.71 cM	End	14,109,236 bp
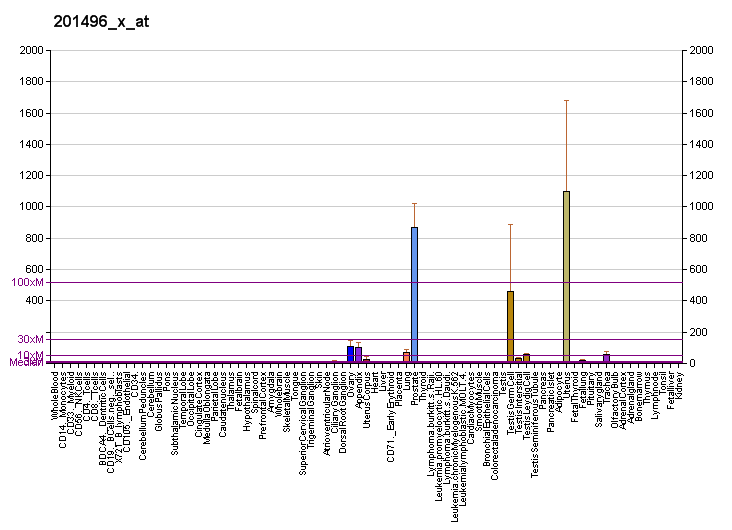

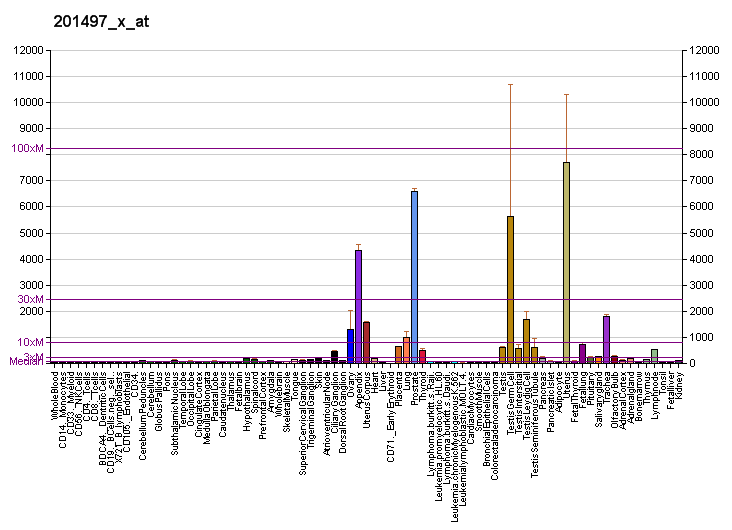

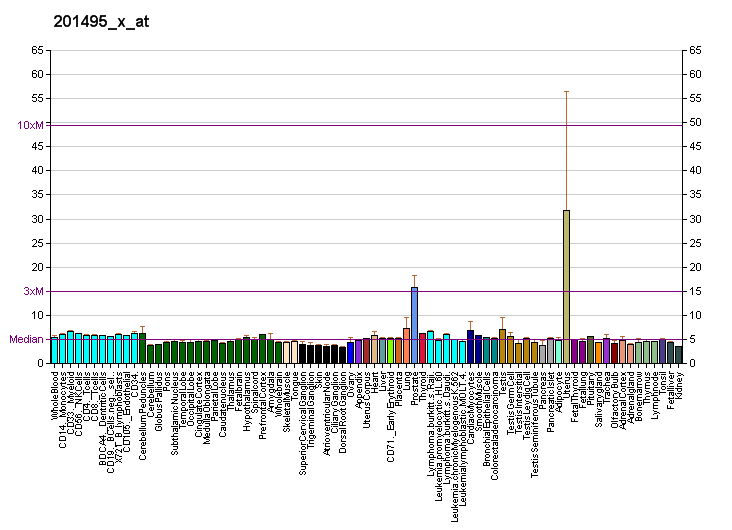
RNA expression pattern
Bgee	Human / Mouse (ortholog); Top expressed in: right coronary artery; gastric mucosa; popliteal artery; tibial arteries; muscle layer of sigmoid colon; Descending thoracic aorta; left coronary artery; smooth muscle tissue; ascending aorta; myometrium / Top expressed in: tunica media of zone of aorta; ascending aorta; aortic valve; uterus; umbilical cord; cervix; seminal vesicula; iris; left colon; tunica adventitia of aorta; More reference expression data
BioGPS	More reference expression data
Gene ontology
Molecular function	nucleotide binding; protein binding; ATP binding; actin binding; cytoskeletal motor activity; structural constituent of muscle; actin filament binding; calmodulin binding; microtubule motor activity; microtubule binding
Cellular component	myosin filament; myosin complex; melanosome; muscle myosin complex; cytosol; extracellular exosome
Biological process	skeletal muscle myosin thick filament assembly; smooth muscle contraction; elastic fiber assembly; muscle contraction; microtubule-based movement
Sources:Amigo / QuickGO
Orthologs
Databases	NCBI: entry; OMA: entry
Species	Human	Mouse
Entrez	4629	17880
Ensembl	ENSG00000133392; ENSG00000276480	ENSMUSG00000018830
UniProt	P35749	O08638
RefSeq (mRNA)	NM_001040113; NM_001040114; NM_002474; NM_022844	NM_001161775; NM_013607
RefSeq (protein)	NP_001035202; NP_001035203; NP_002465; NP_074035; NP_002465.1 NP_074035.1	NP_001155247; NP_038635
Location (UCSC)	Chr 16: 15.7 – 15.86 Mb	Chr 16: 14.01 – 14.11 Mb
PubMed search
- Wikidata
View/Edit Human	View/Edit Mouse

Myosin-11 is a protein that in humans is encoded by the MYH11 gene.

== Function ==
Myosin-11 is a smooth muscle myosin belonging to the myosin heavy chain family. Myosin-11 is a subunit of a hexameric protein that consists of two heavy chain subunits and two pairs of non-identical light chain subunits.

It is a major contractile protein, converting chemical energy into mechanical energy through the hydrolysis of ATP.

Alternative splicing generates isoforms that are differentially expressed, with ratios changing during muscle cell maturation.

== Clinical significance ==
Thoracic aortic aneurysms leading to acute aortic dissections (TAAD) can be inherited in isolation or in association with genetic syndromes, such as Marfan syndrome and Loeys-Dietz syndrome. When TAAD occurs in the absence of syndromic features, it is inherited in an autosomal dominant manner with decreased penetrance and variable expression, the disease is referred to as familial TAAD. Familial TAAD exhibits significant clinical and genetic heterogeneity. Mutations in MYH11 have been described in individuals with TAAD with patent ductus arteriosus (PDA). Of individuals with TAAD, approximately 4% have mutations in TGFBR2, and approximately 1-2% have mutations in either TGFBR1 or MYH11. In addition, FBN1 mutations have also been reported in individuals with TAAD. Mutations within the SMAD3 gene have recently been reported in patients with a syndromic form of aortic aneurysms and dissections with early onset osteoarthritis. SMAD3 mutations are thought to account for approximately 2% of familial TAAD. Additionally, mutations in the ACTA2 gene are thought to account for approximately 10-14% of familial TAAD.

== Acute myeloid leukemia ==
The gene encoding a human ortholog of rat NUDE1 is transcribed from the reverse strand of this gene, and its 3' end overlaps with that of the latter. The pericentric inversion of chromosome 16 [inv(16)(p13q22)] produces a chimeric transcript that encodes a protein consisting of the first 165 residues from the N-terminus of core-binding factor beta in a fusion with the C-terminal portion of the smooth muscle myosin heavy chain. This chromosomal rearrangement is associated with acute myeloid leukemia of the M4Eo subtype.

== Intestinal cancer ==
MYH11 mutations appear to contribute to human intestinal cancer.
