= MYO18B =

Protein-coding gene in the species Homo sapiens

Identifiers
- Aliases: MYO18B, KFS4, myosin XVIIIB
- External IDs: OMIM: 607295; MGI: 1921626; GeneCards: MYO18B

Gene location (Human)
Chr.	Chromosome 22 (human)
Band	22q12.1	Start	25,742,144 bp
Band	22q12.1	End	26,031,045 bp

Gene location (Mouse)
Chr.	Chromosome 5 (mouse)
Band	5|5 F	Start	112,836,742 bp
Band	5|5 F	End	113,044,228 bp
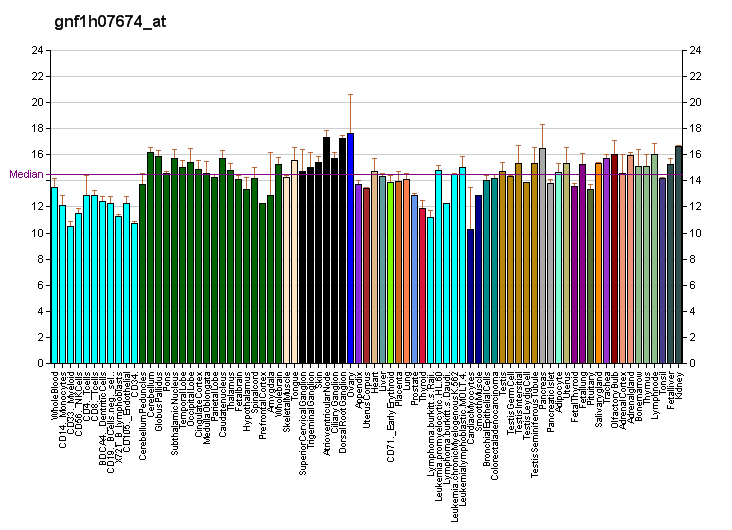
RNA expression pattern
Bgee	Human / Mouse (ortholog); Top expressed in: apex of heart; gastrocnemius muscle; muscle of thigh; Skeletal muscle tissue of rectus abdominis; left ventricle; Skeletal muscle tissue of biceps brachii; right auricle of heart; quadriceps femoris muscle; vastus lateralis muscle; right ventricle / Top expressed in: muscle of thigh; esophagus; spermatid; lip; skeletal muscle tissue; lens; embryo; quadriceps femoris muscle; superior frontal gyrus; heart; More reference expression data
BioGPS	More reference expression data
Gene ontology
Molecular function	nucleotide binding; actin binding; cytoskeletal motor activity; ATP binding; microtubule motor activity; microtubule binding
Cellular component	cytoplasm; unconventional myosin complex; sarcomere; nucleus; myosin complex; Z discdkac; filamentous actin
Biological process	microtubule-based movement; vasculogenesis; in utero embryonic development
Sources:Amigo / QuickGO
Orthologs
Databases	NCBI: entry; OMA: entry
Species	Human	Mouse
Entrez	84700	74376
Ensembl	ENSG00000133454	ENSMUSG00000072720
UniProt	Q8IUG5	n/a
RefSeq (mRNA)	NM_032608; NM_001318245	NM_028901
RefSeq (protein)	NP_001305174; NP_115997	n/a
Location (UCSC)	Chr 22: 25.74 – 26.03 Mb	Chr 5: 112.84 – 113.04 Mb
PubMed search
- Wikidata
View/Edit Human	View/Edit Mouse

Myosin-XVIIIb is a protein that in humans is encoded by the MYO18B gene.

The protein encoded by this gene may regulate muscle-specific genes when in the nucleus and may influence intracellular trafficking when in the cytoplasm. The encoded protein functions as a homodimer and may interact with F actin. Mutations in this gene are associated with lung cancer.
