= MYO1B =

Protein-coding gene in the species Homo sapiens

Identifiers
- Aliases: MYO1B, myr1, myosin IB, MMIa, MMI-alpha, MYH-1c
- External IDs: OMIM: 606537; MGI: 107752; GeneCards: MYO1B

Gene location (Human)
Chr.	Chromosome 2 (human)
Band	2q32.3	Start	191,245,185 bp
Band	2q32.3	End	191,425,389 bp

Gene location (Mouse)
Chr.	Chromosome 1 (mouse)
Band	1 C1.1|1 26.58 cM	Start	51,788,924 bp
Band	1 C1.1|1 26.58 cM	End	51,955,230 bp
RNA expression pattern
Bgee	Human / Mouse (ortholog); Top expressed in: visceral pleura; liver; right lobe of liver; islet of Langerhans; lower lobe of lung; right lung; hair follicle; stromal cell of endometrium; tibia; parietal pleura / Top expressed in: genital tubercle; tail of embryo; lumbar spinal ganglion; right lung; lens; right lung lobe; seminal vesicula; left lung; left lobe of liver; calvaria; More reference expression data
BioGPS	n/a
Gene ontology
Molecular function	nucleotide binding; calmodulin binding; microfilament motor activity; actin binding; phosphatidylinositol-4,5-bisphosphate binding; cytoskeletal motor activity; ATP binding; phosphatidylinositol-3,4,5-trisphosphate binding; actin filament binding; cadherin binding
Cellular component	cytoplasm; trans-Golgi network membrane; filopodium; early endosome; brush border; actin filament; perinuclear region of cytoplasm; endosome membrane; extracellular exosome; cell periphery; myosin complex; plasma membrane; apical part of cell
Biological process	actin filament organization; actin filament-based movement; actin filament bundle assembly; post-Golgi vesicle-mediated transport
Sources:Amigo / QuickGO
Orthologs
Databases	NCBI: entry; OMA: entry
Species	Human	Mouse
Entrez	4430	17912
Ensembl	ENSG00000128641	ENSMUSG00000018417
UniProt	O43795	P46735
RefSeq (mRNA)	NM_001130158; NM_001161819; NM_012223; NM_001330237; NM_001330238	NM_001161817; NM_001290982; NM_010863
RefSeq (protein)	NP_001123630; NP_001155291; NP_001317166; NP_001317167; NP_036355	NP_001155289; NP_001277911; NP_034993
Location (UCSC)	Chr 2: 191.25 – 191.43 Mb	Chr 1: 51.79 – 51.96 Mb
PubMed search
- Wikidata
View/Edit Human	View/Edit Mouse

Myosin-Ib is a protein that in humans is encoded by the MYO1B gene.
