= MYO1F =

Protein-coding gene in the species Homo sapiens

Identifiers
- Aliases: MYO1F, myosin IF
- External IDs: OMIM: 601480; MGI: 107711; GeneCards: MYO1F

Gene location (Human)
Chr.	Chromosome 19 (human)
Band	19p13.2	Start	8,520,778 bp
Band	19p13.2	End	8,577,577 bp

Gene location (Mouse)
Chr.	Chromosome 17 (mouse)
Band	17 B1|17 17.98 cM	Start	33,774,681 bp
Band	17 B1|17 17.98 cM	End	33,826,738 bp
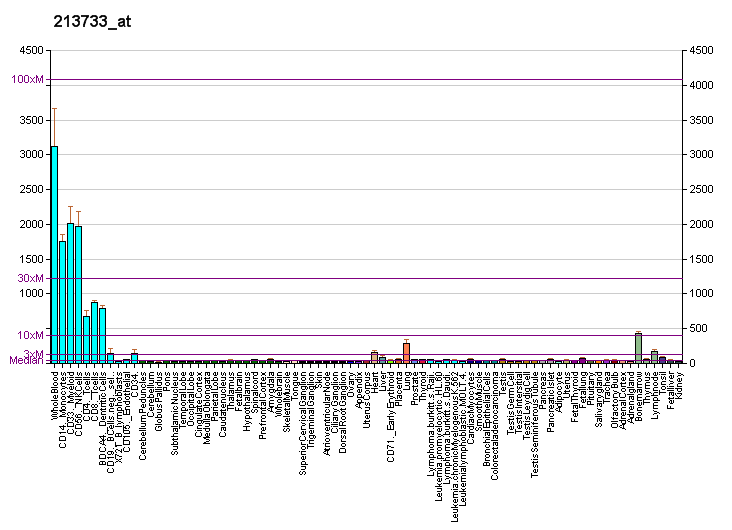
RNA expression pattern
Bgee	Human / Mouse (ortholog); Top expressed in: granulocyte; monocyte; blood; spleen; bone marrow cell; right lung; appendix; upper lobe of left lung; sural nerve; trabecular bone / Top expressed in: granulocyte; stroma of bone marrow; blood; spleen; mesenteric lymph nodes; lumbar spinal ganglion; calvaria; thymus; subcutaneous adipose tissue; right lung lobe; More reference expression data
BioGPS	More reference expression data
Gene ontology
Molecular function	nucleotide binding; actin binding; cytoskeletal motor activity; ATP binding; calmodulin binding; microtubule motor activity; microtubule binding
Cellular component	unconventional myosin complex; myosin complex
Biological process	biological process; microtubule-based movement
Sources:Amigo / QuickGO
Orthologs
Databases	NCBI: entry; OMA: entry
Species	Human	Mouse
Entrez	4542	17916
Ensembl	ENSG00000142347	ENSMUSG00000024300
UniProt	O00160	P70248
RefSeq (mRNA)	NM_012335; NM_001348355	NM_053214
RefSeq (protein)	NP_036467; NP_001335284	n/a
Location (UCSC)	Chr 19: 8.52 – 8.58 Mb	Chr 17: 33.77 – 33.83 Mb
PubMed search
- Wikidata
View/Edit Human	View/Edit Mouse

Myosin-If is a protein that in humans is encoded by the MYO1F gene.

It is expressed mainly in the immune system and might be involved in cell adhesion and motility. It is a candidate gene for (among other things) nonsyndromic deafness.
