= MYH13 =

Protein-coding gene in the species Homo sapiens

Identifiers
- Aliases: MYH13, MyHC-IIL, MyHC-eo, myosin, heavy chain 13, skeletal muscle, myosin heavy chain 13
- External IDs: OMIM: 603487; MGI: 1339967; GeneCards: MYH13

Gene location (Human)
Chr.	Chromosome 17 (human)
Band	17p13.1	Start	10,300,865 bp
Band	17p13.1	End	10,373,130 bp

Gene location (Mouse)
Chr.	Chromosome 11 (mouse)
Band	11 B3|11 40.85 cM	Start	67,212,484 bp
Band	11 B3|11 40.85 cM	End	67,262,412 bp
RNA expression pattern
Bgee	Human / Mouse (ortholog); Top expressed in: gonad; skeletal muscle tissue; tibialis anterior muscle; muscle of thigh; body of stomach; synovial joint; placenta; gastrocnemius muscle; fundus; myometrium / Top expressed in: morula; skeletal muscle tissue; muscle of thigh; quadriceps femoris muscle; zone of skin; blastocyst; lung; pancreas; tail of embryo; esophagus; More reference expression data
BioGPS	n/a
Gene ontology
Molecular function	nucleotide binding; actin binding; microfilament motor activity; cytoskeletal motor activity; ATP binding; calmodulin binding; actin filament binding
Cellular component	cytoplasm; myosin filament; muscle myosin complex; myofibril; extracellular exosome; myosin complex
Biological process	muscle contraction; cellular response to starvation
Sources:Amigo / QuickGO
Orthologs
Databases	NCBI: entry; OMA: entry
Species	Human	Mouse
Entrez	8735	544791
Ensembl	ENSG00000006788	ENSMUSG00000060180
UniProt	Q9UKX3	n/a
RefSeq (mRNA)	NM_003802	NM_001081250
RefSeq (protein)	NP_003793	n/a
Location (UCSC)	Chr 17: 10.3 – 10.37 Mb	Chr 11: 67.21 – 67.26 Mb
PubMed search
- Wikidata
View/Edit Human	View/Edit Mouse

Myosin-13 also known as myosin, heavy chain 13 is a protein which in humans is encoded by the MYH13 gene.

== Function ==
MYH13 is a myosin whose expression is restricted primarily to the extrinsic eye muscles which are specialized for function in eye movement.
