= MYH16 =

Gene in humans

Identifiers
- Aliases: MYH16, MHC20, MYH16P, MYH5, myosin, heavy chain 16 pseudogene, myosin heavy chain 16 pseudogene, MYH16 gene
- External IDs: GeneCards: MYH16

Gene location (Human)
Chr.	Chromosome 7 (human)
Band	7q22.1	Start	99,238,829 bp
Band	7q22.1	End	99,311,130 bp
RNA expression pattern
Bgee	Human / Mouse (ortholog); Top expressed in: testicle; right testis; left testis; islet of Langerhans; right uterine tube; stromal cell of endometrium; gallbladder; gonad; tibial arteries; skeletal muscle tissue / n/a; More reference expression data
BioGPS	n/a
Orthologs
Databases	NCBI: entry; OMA: entry
Species	Human	Mouse
Entrez	84176	n/a
Ensembl	ENSG00000002079	n/a
UniProt	Q9H6N6	n/a
RefSeq (mRNA)	n/a	n/a
RefSeq (protein)	n/a	n/a
Location (UCSC)	Chr 7: 99.24 – 99.31 Mb	n/a
PubMed search		n/a
- Wikidata
View/Edit Human

MYH16 is a gene that in humans may encode a protein called Putative uncharacterized protein MYH16. In humans, this gene has suffered a significant mutation, and so its status as a protein-coding gene or psuedogene is uncertain. However, there is some evidence that it does still encode a protein, but a shorter one with only the myosin tail domain.

In other mammals, it encodes a protein called myosin heavy chain 16. At least in primates, it is a specialized muscle protein found only in the temporalis and masseter muscles of the jaw. Myosin heavy chain proteins are important in muscle contraction, and if they are missing, the muscles will be smaller. In non-human primates, MYH16 is functional and the animals have powerful jaw muscles. In humans, the MYH16 gene has a mutation that causes the protein not to function. Although the exact importance of this change in accounting for differences between humans and other apes is not yet clear, such a change may be related to increased brain size and finer control of the jaw, which facilitates speech. It is not clear how the MYH16 mutation relates to other changes to the jaw and skull in early human evolution (for example, whether the MYH16 mutation happened first and led to other changes, or whether the MYH16 mutation happened after other changes made the MYH16 protein no longer necessary).

The initial discovery of the human MYH16 mutation was published in 2004 by a team at the University of Pennsylvania led by Hansell H. Stedman. The date of the mutation has variously been estimated at 2.4 million years ago or 5.3 million years ago.

The MYH16 gene is present in dogs, but does not appear to be present in mice.
