= Myosin head =

Part of myofilaments

Myosin_head
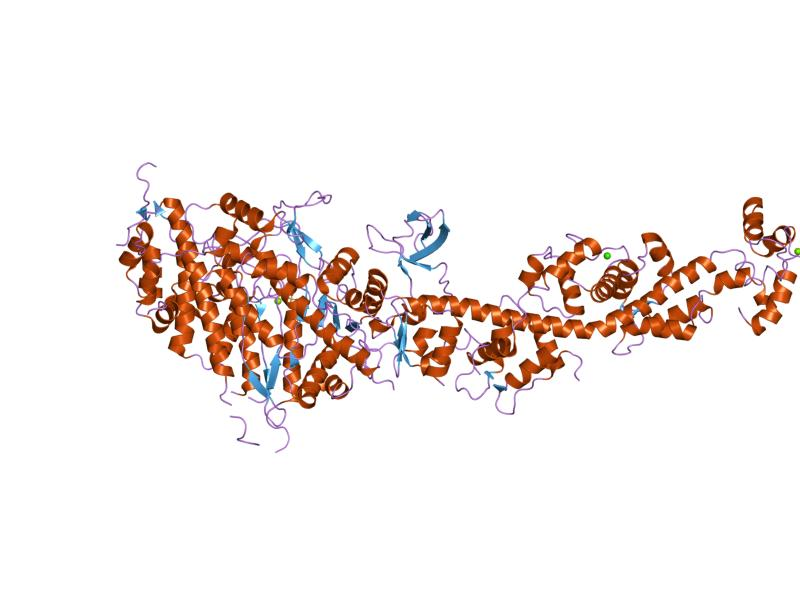
- Scallop myosin in the near-rigor conformation

Identifiers
- Symbol: Myosin_head
- Pfam: PF00063
- Pfam clan: CL0023
- InterPro: IPR001609
- PROSITE: PDOC00017
- SCOP2: 1mys / SCOPe / SUPFAM
- CDD: cd00124
Available protein structures:
- PDB: IPR001609 PF00063 (ECOD; PDBsum)
- AlphaFold: IPR001609; PF00063

The myosin head is the part of the thick myofilament made up of myosin that acts in muscle contraction, by sliding over thin myofilaments of actin. Myosin is the major component of the thick filaments and most myosin molecules are composed of a head, neck, and tail domain; the myosin head binds to thin filamentous actin, and uses ATP hydrolysis to generate force and "walk" along the thin filament. Myosin exists as a hexamer of two heavy chains, two alkali light chains, and two regulatory light chains. The heavy chain can be subdivided into the globular head at the N-terminal and the coiled-coil rod-like tail at the C-terminal, although some forms have a globular region in their C-terminal.

There are many cell-specific isoforms of myosin heavy chains, coded for by a multi-gene family. Myosin interacts with actin to convert chemical energy, in the form of ATP, to mechanical energy. The 3-D structure of the head portion of myosin has been determined and a model for the actin-myosin complex has been constructed.

The globular head is well conserved, and is key to contraction. Muscle contraction results from an attachment–detachment cycle between the myosin heads extending from myosin filaments and the sites on actin filaments. The myosin head first attaches to actin together with the products of ATP hydrolysis, performs a power stroke associated with release of hydrolysis products, and detaches from actin upon binding with new ATP. The detached myosin head then hydrolyses ATP, and performs a recovery stroke to restore its initial position. The strokes have been suggested to result from rotation of the lever arm domain around the converter domain, while the catalytic domain remains rigid.
