= MYH15 =

Protein-coding gene in the species Homo sapiens

Identifiers
- Aliases: MYH15, myosin heavy chain 15
- External IDs: OMIM: 609929; MGI: 3643515; GeneCards: MYH15

Gene location (Human)
| Chr. | Chromosome 3 (human) |
| Band | 3q13.13 | Start | 108,380,368 bp |
| Band | 3q13.13 | End | 108,529,322 bp |

Gene location (Mouse)
| Chr. | Chromosome 16 (mouse) |
| Band | 16|16 B5 | Start | 48,877,849 bp |
| Band | 16|16 B5 | End | 49,019,467 bp |
RNA expression pattern
| Bgee | Human / Mouse (ortholog); Top expressed in: paraflocculus of cerebellum; frontal pole; middle frontal gyrus; gonad; testicle; optic nerve; C1 segment; rectum; prefrontal cortex; cingulate gyrus / Top expressed in: spermatid; secondary oocyte; testicle; primary oocyte; zygote; lens; dentate gyrus of hippocampal formation granule cell; hypothalamus; striatum of neuraxis; hippocampus proper; More reference expression data |
| BioGPS | n/a |
Gene ontology
| Molecular function | nucleotide binding; actin binding; cytoskeletal motor activity; ATP binding; calmodulin binding; actin filament binding; microtubule motor activity; microtubule binding |
| Cellular component | cytoplasm; myosin filament; myofibril; myosin complex |
| Biological process | extraocular skeletal muscle development; microtubule-based movement |
Sources:Amigo / QuickGO
Orthologs
| Databases | NCBI: entry; OMA: entry |
| Species | Human | Mouse |
| Entrez | 22989 | 667772 |
| Ensembl | ENSG00000144821 | ENSMUSG00000092009 |
| UniProt | Q9Y2K3 | E9Q264 |
| RefSeq (mRNA) | NM_014981 | NM_001166210 |
| RefSeq (protein) | NP_055796 | NP_001159682 |
| Location (UCSC) | Chr 3: 108.38 – 108.53 Mb | Chr 16: 48.88 – 49.02 Mb |
| PubMed search |
- Wikidata
| View/Edit Human | View/Edit Mouse |

Myosin-15 also known as myosin, heavy chain 15 is a protein that in humans is encoded by the MYH15 gene.

== Function ==
MYH15 is a slow-twitch myosin.
