= MYO15A =

Protein-coding gene in the species Homo sapiens

Identifiers
- Aliases: MYO15A, DFNB3, MYO15, myosin XVA
- External IDs: OMIM: 602666; MGI: 1261811; GeneCards: MYO15A

Gene location (Human)
Chr.	Chromosome 17 (human)
Band	17p11.2	Start	18,108,756 bp
Band	17p11.2	End	18,179,802 bp

Gene location (Mouse)
Chr.	Chromosome 11 (mouse)
Band	11 B2|11 37.81 cM	Start	60,360,165 bp
Band	11 B2|11 37.81 cM	End	60,419,195 bp
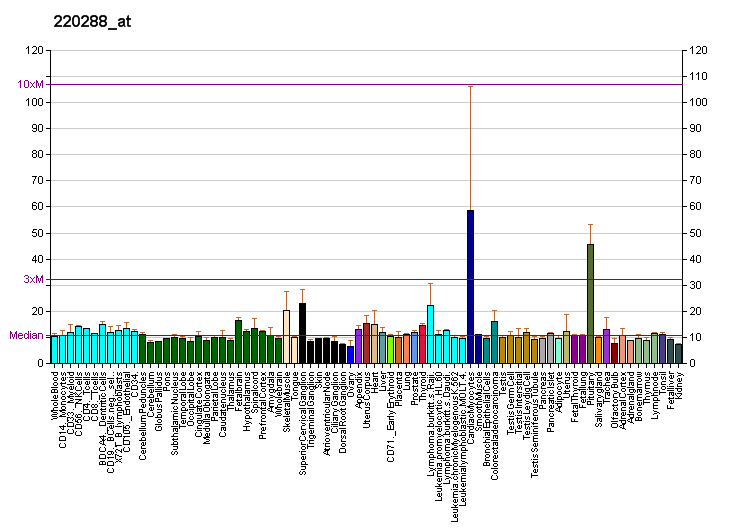
RNA expression pattern
Bgee	Human / Mouse (ortholog); Top expressed in: pituitary gland; anterior pituitary; left testis; right testis; right hemisphere of cerebellum; testicle; right frontal lobe; gonad; left ovary; sural nerve / Top expressed in: epithelium of macula of saccule of membranous labyrinth; utricle; pituitary gland; lumbar subsegment of spinal cord; embryo; tibiofemoral joint; trachea; vestibular membrane of cochlear duct; facial motor nucleus; zygote; More reference expression data
BioGPS	More reference expression data
Gene ontology
Molecular function	nucleotide binding; actin binding; cytoskeletal motor activity; ATP binding; calmodulin binding
Cellular component	cytoplasm; stereocilium bundle; cell projection; extracellular exosome; cytoskeleton; myosin complex; stereocilium
Biological process	hearing; inner ear morphogenesis; locomotory behavior
Sources:Amigo / QuickGO
Orthologs
Databases	NCBI: entry; OMA: entry
Species	Human	Mouse
Entrez	51168	17910
Ensembl	ENSG00000091536	ENSMUSG00000042678
UniProt	Q9UKN7	Q9QZZ4
RefSeq (mRNA)	NM_016239	NM_001103171; NM_010862; NM_182698
RefSeq (protein)	NP_057323	NP_001096641; NP_034992; NP_874357
Location (UCSC)	Chr 17: 18.11 – 18.18 Mb	Chr 11: 60.36 – 60.42 Mb
PubMed search
- Wikidata
View/Edit Human	View/Edit Mouse

Unconventional myosin-XV is a protein that in humans is encoded by the MYO15A gene.

== Gene ==
Read-through transcript containing an upstream gene and this gene have been identified, but they are not thought to encode a fusion protein. Several alternatively spliced transcript variants have been described, but their full length sequences have not been determined.

== Function ==
This gene encodes an unconventional myosin. This protein differs from other myosins in that it has a long N-terminal extension preceding the conserved motor domain. Studies in mice suggest that this protein is necessary for actin organization in the hair cells of the cochlea.

== Clinical significance ==
Mutations in this gene have been associated with profound, congenital, neurosensory, nonsyndromic deafness. This gene is located within the Smith–Magenis syndrome region on chromosome 17.
