= MYH14 =

Protein-coding gene in the species Homo sapiens

Identifiers
- Aliases: MYH14, DFNA4, DFNA4A, MHC16, MYH17, NMHC II-C, NMHC-II-C, PNMHH, myosin, FP17425, myosin, heavy chain 14, non-muscle, myosin heavy chain 14
- External IDs: OMIM: 608568; MGI: 1919210; GeneCards: MYH14
Available structures
PDB	Ortholog search: PDBe RCSB
PDB	List of PDB id codes 5JLH

Gene location (Human)
Chr.	Chromosome 19 (human)
Band	19q13.33	Start	50,188,186 bp
Band	19q13.33	End	50,310,542 bp

Gene location (Mouse)
Chr.	Chromosome 7 (mouse)
Band	7|7 B3	Start	44,255,227 bp
Band	7|7 B3	End	44,320,267 bp
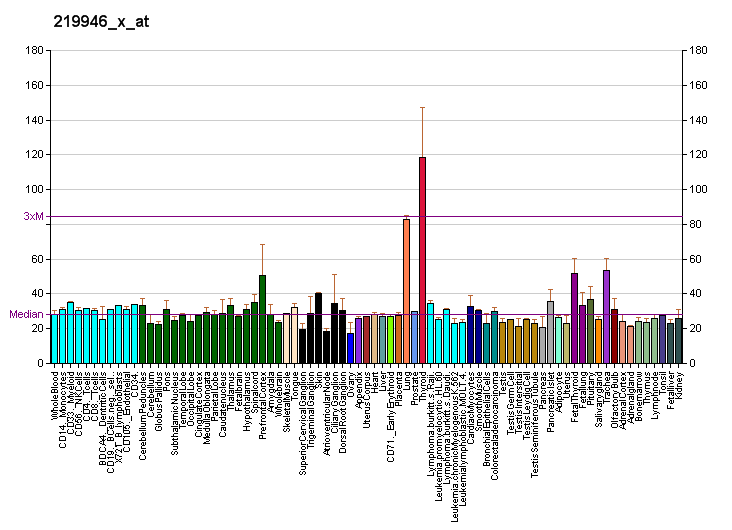

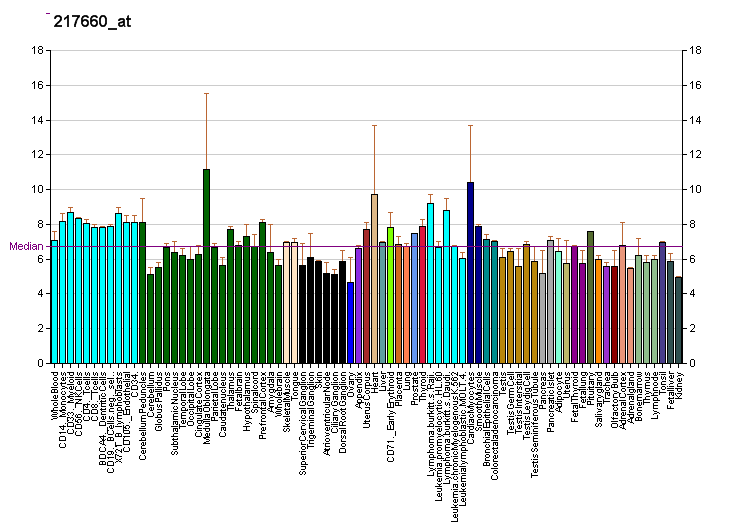

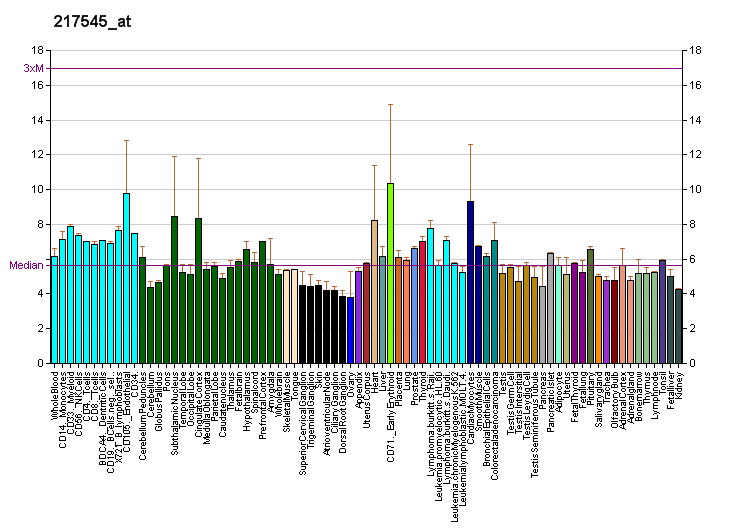
RNA expression pattern
Bgee	Human / Mouse (ortholog); Top expressed in: mucosa of transverse colon; mucosa of ileum; gastrocnemius muscle; skin of leg; skin of abdomen; apex of heart; muscle of thigh; olfactory zone of nasal mucosa; minor salivary glands; tibialis anterior muscle / Top expressed in: corneal stroma; saccule; superior surface of tongue; left colon; duodenum; right lung; gallbladder; right lung lobe; crypt of lieberkuhn of small intestine; ileum; More reference expression data
BioGPS	More reference expression data
Gene ontology
Molecular function	nucleotide binding; calmodulin binding; actin filament binding; microfilament motor activity; actin binding; cytoskeletal motor activity; ATP binding; ATPase activity; microtubule motor activity; microtubule binding
Cellular component	cytoplasm; cytosol; myosin II filament; membrane; growth cone; myelin sheath; stress fiber; axon; brush border; myosin II complex; actomyosin; extracellular exosome; myosin complex
Biological process	skeletal muscle contraction; actomyosin structure organization; hearing; actin filament-based movement; vocalization behavior; regulation of cell shape; mitochondrion morphogenesis; skeletal muscle tissue development; neuronal action potential; microtubule-based movement
Sources:Amigo / QuickGO
Orthologs
Databases	NCBI: entry; OMA: entry
Species	Human	Mouse
Entrez	79784	71960
Ensembl	ENSG00000105357	ENSMUSG00000030739
UniProt	Q7Z406	Q6URW6
RefSeq (mRNA)	NM_001077186; NM_001145809; NM_024729	NM_001271538; NM_001271540; NM_028021
RefSeq (protein)	NP_001070654; NP_001139281; NP_079005	NP_001258467; NP_001258469; NP_082297
Location (UCSC)	Chr 19: 50.19 – 50.31 Mb	Chr 7: 44.26 – 44.32 Mb
PubMed search
- Wikidata
View/Edit Human	View/Edit Mouse

Myosin-14 is a protein that in humans is encoded by the MYH14 gene.

This gene encodes a member of the myosin superfamily. Myosins are actin-dependent motor proteins with diverse functions, including regulation of cytokinesis, cell motility, and cell polarity. Mutations in this gene result in one form of autosomal dominant hearing impairment. Multiple transcript variants encoding different isoforms have been found for this gene.
