= MYH7B =

Protein-coding gene in the species Homo sapiens

Identifiers
- Aliases: MYH7B, MHC14, MYH14, myosin, heavy chain 7B, cardiac muscle, beta, myosin heavy chain 7B
- External IDs: OMIM: 609928; MGI: 3710243; GeneCards: MYH7B

Gene location (Human)
Chr.	Chromosome 20 (human)
Band	20q11.22	Start	34,955,810 bp
Band	20q11.22	End	35,002,437 bp

Gene location (Mouse)
Chr.	Chromosome 2 (mouse)
Band	2|2 H1	Start	155,453,132 bp
Band	2|2 H1	End	155,476,227 bp
RNA expression pattern
Bgee	Human / Mouse (ortholog); Top expressed in: apex of heart; muscle of thigh; left ventricle; right auricle of heart; Skeletal muscle tissue of rectus abdominis; body of tongue; biceps brachii; Skeletal muscle tissue of biceps brachii; lateral nuclear group of thalamus; sperm / Top expressed in: vascular smooth muscle; lens; neural layer of retina; left ventricle; soleus muscle; vasculature of trunk; superior frontal gyrus; cerebellar cortex; myocardium of atrium; primary visual cortex; More reference expression data
BioGPS	n/a
Gene ontology
Molecular function	nucleotide binding; actin binding; cytoskeletal motor activity; protein binding; ATP binding; actin filament binding; microtubule motor activity; microtubule binding
Cellular component	myosin filament; membrane; myosin complex; cardiac myofibril
Biological process	microtubule-based movement
Sources:Amigo / QuickGO
Orthologs
Databases	NCBI: entry; OMA: entry
Species	Human	Mouse
Entrez	57644	668940
Ensembl	ENSG00000078814	ENSMUSG00000074652
UniProt	Q5JW45	A2AQP0
RefSeq (mRNA)	NM_020884; NM_033424	NM_001085378
RefSeq (protein)	NP_065935	NP_001078847
Location (UCSC)	Chr 20: 34.96 – 35 Mb	Chr 2: 155.45 – 155.48 Mb
PubMed search
- Wikidata
View/Edit Human	View/Edit Mouse

Myosin-7B also known as myosin, heavy chain 7B is a protein that in humans is encoded by the MYH7B gene.

== Function ==
MYH7B is a slow-twitch myosin.
