= MYH3 =

Protein-coding gene in the species Homo sapiens

Identifiers
- Aliases: MYH3, HEMHC, MYHC-EMB, MYHSE1, SMHCE, DA2A, DA2B, DA8, myosin, heavy chain 3, skeletal muscle, embryonic, myosin heavy chain 3, CPSKF1A, DA2B3, CPSKF1B, CPSFS1B, CPSFS1A
- External IDs: OMIM: 160720; MGI: 1339709; GeneCards: MYH3

Gene location (Human)
Chr.	Chromosome 17 (human)
Band	17p13.1	Start	10,628,526 bp
Band	17p13.1	End	10,657,309 bp

Gene location (Mouse)
Chr.	Chromosome 11 (mouse)
Band	11 B3|11 40.59 cM	Start	66,969,126 bp
Band	11 B3|11 40.59 cM	End	66,993,117 bp
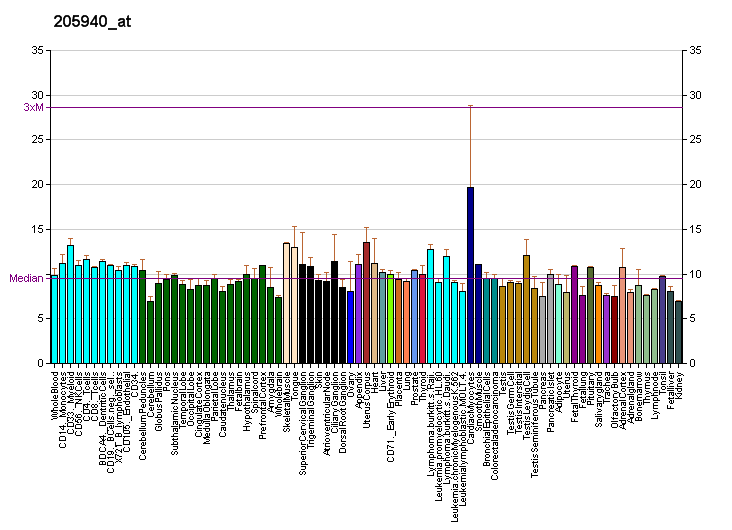
RNA expression pattern
Bgee	Human / Mouse (ortholog); Top expressed in: left testis; right testis; sperm; muscle of thigh; Skeletal muscle tissue of rectus abdominis; gastrocnemius muscle; testicle; seminal vesicula; sural nerve; glutes / Top expressed in: extraocular muscle; epidermis; upper arm; muscle of arm; mesenchyme; synovial joint; atrium; ankle joint; autopod region; hand; More reference expression data
BioGPS	More reference expression data
Gene ontology
Molecular function	nucleotide binding; calmodulin binding; microfilament motor activity; actin binding; cytoskeletal motor activity; ATP binding; myosin phosphatase activity; actin filament binding
Cellular component	cytoplasm; cytosol; sarcomere; myofibril; myosin filament; muscle myosin complex; extracellular exosome; myosin complex; contractile fiber
Biological process	skeletal muscle contraction; muscle organ development; actin filament-based movement; ATP metabolic process; embryonic limb morphogenesis; muscle filament sliding; sarcomere organization; face morphogenesis; protein dephosphorylation
Sources:Amigo / QuickGO
Orthologs
Databases	NCBI: entry; OMA: entry
Species	Human	Mouse
Entrez	4621	17883
Ensembl	ENSG00000109063	ENSMUSG00000020908
UniProt	P11055	P13541
RefSeq (mRNA)	NM_002470	NM_001099635
RefSeq (protein)	NP_002461	NP_001093105
Location (UCSC)	Chr 17: 10.63 – 10.66 Mb	Chr 11: 66.97 – 66.99 Mb
PubMed search
- Wikidata
View/Edit Human	View/Edit Mouse

Myosin-3 is a protein that in humans is encoded by the MYH3 gene.

== Function ==
Myosin is a major contractile protein which converts chemical energy into mechanical energy through the hydrolysis of ATP. Myosin is a hexameric protein composed of a pair of myosin heavy chains (MYH) and two pairs of nonidentical light chains. This gene is a member of the MYH family and encodes a protein with an IQ domain and a myosin head-like domain. Mutations in this gene have been associated with two congenital contracture (arthrogryposis) syndromes, Freeman–Sheldon syndrome and Sheldon–Hall syndrome.
