= Myosin-2 =

Protein-coding gene in the species Homo sapiens

MYH2

Identifiers
- Aliases: MYH2, IBM3, MYH2A, MYHSA2, MYHas8, MyHC-2A, MyHC-IIa, MYPOP, myosin, heavy chain 2, skeletal muscle, adult, myosin heavy chain 2
- External IDs: OMIM: 160740; MGI: 1339710; GeneCards: MYH2

Gene location (Human)
| Chr. | Chromosome 17 (human) |
| Band | 17p13.1 | Start | 10,521,148 bp |
| Band | 17p13.1 | End | 10,549,700 bp |

Gene location (Mouse)
| Chr. | Chromosome 11 (mouse) |
| Band | 11 B3|11 40.59 cM | Start | 67,061,853 bp |
| Band | 11 B3|11 40.59 cM | End | 67,088,343 bp |
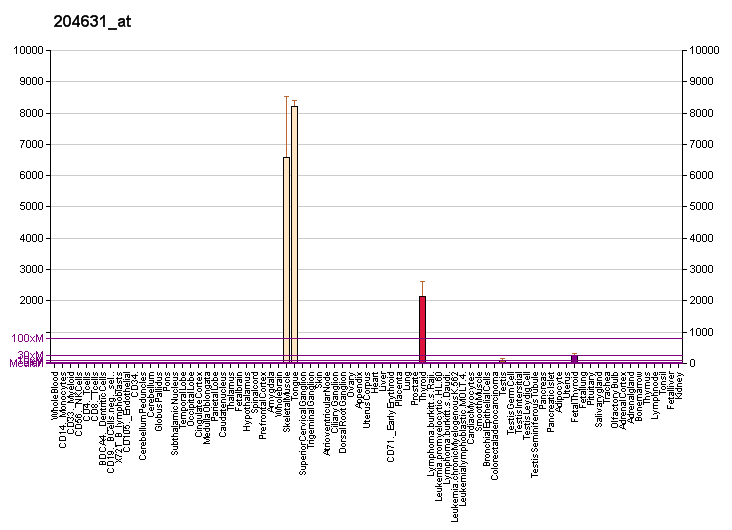
RNA expression pattern
| Bgee | Human / Mouse (ortholog); Top expressed in: Skeletal muscle tissue of rectus abdominis; Skeletal muscle tissue of biceps brachii; body of tongue; vastus lateralis muscle; thoracic diaphragm; triceps brachii muscle; glutes; muscle of thigh; deltoid muscle; gastrocnemius muscle / Top expressed in: soleus muscle; intercostal muscle; sternocleidomastoid muscle; ankle; masseter muscle; temporal muscle; extraocular muscle; digastric muscle; medial head of gastrocnemius muscle; vastus lateralis muscle; More reference expression data |
| BioGPS | More reference expression data |
Gene ontology
| Molecular function | nucleotide binding; actin binding; microfilament motor activity; protein binding; cytoskeletal motor activity; ATP binding; calmodulin binding; actin filament binding; microtubule motor activity; microtubule binding |
| Cellular component | cytoplasm; myosin filament; cytosol; myofibril; sarcomere; myosin complex; A band; protein-containing complex; Golgi apparatus; actomyosin contractile ring; muscle myosin complex; cell-cell junction |
| Biological process | Fc-gamma receptor signaling pathway involved in phagocytosis; muscle filament sliding; microtubule-based movement; plasma membrane repair; muscle contraction; response to activity; actin-mediated cell contraction |
Sources:Amigo / QuickGO
Orthologs
| Databases | NCBI: entry; OMA: entry |
| Species | Human | Mouse |
| Entrez | 4620 | 17882 |
| Ensembl | ENSG00000125414 | ENSMUSG00000033196 |
| UniProt | Q9UKX2 | G3UW82 |
| RefSeq (mRNA) | NM_017534; NM_001100112 | NM_001039545; NM_144961 |
| RefSeq (protein) | NP_001093582; NP_060004 | NP_001034634 |
| Location (UCSC) | Chr 17: 10.52 – 10.55 Mb | Chr 11: 67.06 – 67.09 Mb |
| PubMed search |
- Wikidata
| View/Edit Human | View/Edit Mouse |

Myosin-2 (myosin heavy chain 2) is a protein that in humans is encoded by the MYH2 gene.
