= MYH4 =

Protein-coding gene in the species Homo sapiens

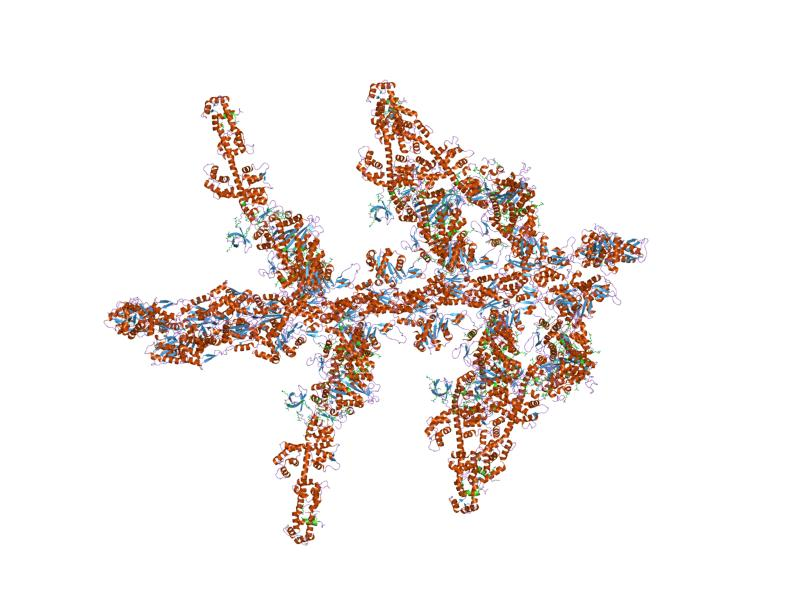

Identifiers
- Aliases: MYH4, MYH2B, MyHC-2B, MyHC-IIb, myosin, heavy chain 4, skeletal muscle, myosin heavy chain 4
- External IDs: OMIM: 160742; MGI: 1339713; GeneCards: MYH4

Gene location (Human)
Chr.	Chromosome 17 (human)
Band	17p13.1	Start	10,443,290 bp
Band	17p13.1	End	10,469,559 bp

Gene location (Mouse)
Chr.	Chromosome 11 (mouse)
Band	11 B3|11 40.59 cM	Start	67,128,855 bp
Band	11 B3|11 40.59 cM	End	67,151,272 bp
RNA expression pattern
Bgee	Human / Mouse (ortholog); Top expressed in: Skeletal muscle tissue of rectus abdominis; vastus lateralis muscle; biceps brachii; Skeletal muscle tissue of biceps brachii; deltoid muscle; muscle of thigh; testicle; thoracic diaphragm; tibialis anterior muscle; gastrocnemius muscle / Top expressed in: extensor digitorum longus muscle; tibialis anterior muscle; vastus lateralis muscle; medial head of gastrocnemius muscle; sternocleidomastoid muscle; plantaris muscle; triceps brachii muscle; digastric muscle; temporal muscle; body of femur; More reference expression data
BioGPS	n/a
Gene ontology
Molecular function	nucleotide binding; actin binding; microfilament motor activity; double-stranded RNA binding; ATPase activity; cytoskeletal motor activity; ATP binding; calmodulin binding; actin filament binding; microtubule motor activity; microtubule binding
Cellular component	cytoplasm; myosin filament; muscle myosin complex; myofibril; sarcomere; myosin complex
Biological process	ATP metabolic process; muscle contraction; actin filament-based movement; muscle filament sliding; microtubule-based movement; response to activity
Sources:Amigo / QuickGO
Orthologs
Databases	NCBI: entry; OMA: entry
Species	Human	Mouse
Entrez	4622	17884
Ensembl	ENSG00000264424	ENSMUSG00000057003
UniProt	Q9Y623	Q5SX39
RefSeq (mRNA)	NM_017533	NM_010855
RefSeq (protein)	NP_060003	NP_034985
Location (UCSC)	Chr 17: 10.44 – 10.47 Mb	Chr 11: 67.13 – 67.15 Mb
PubMed search
- Wikidata
View/Edit Human	View/Edit Mouse

Myosin-4 also known as myosin, heavy chain 4 is a protein which in humans is encoded by the MYH4 gene.

== Function ==
MYH4 is a gene that encodes a sarcomeric myosin.
