= Troponin C, slow skeletal and cardiac muscles =

Protein-coding gene in the species Homo sapiens

TNNC1
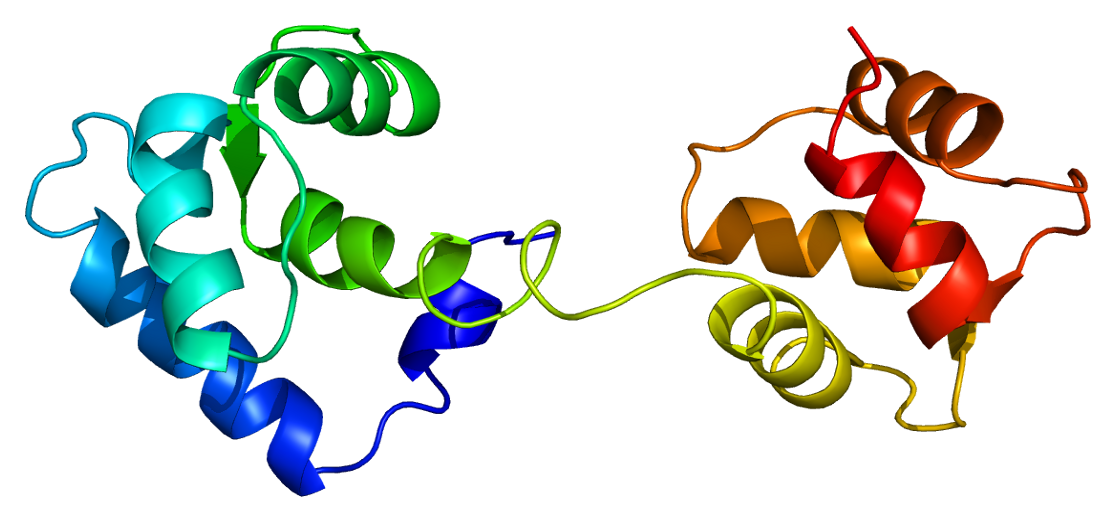

Identifiers
- Aliases: TNNC1, CMD1Z, CMH13, TN-C, TNC, TNNC, Troponin C type 1, troponin C1, slow skeletal and cardiac type
- External IDs: OMIM: 191040; MGI: 98779; GeneCards: TNNC1
Available structures
| PDB | Ortholog search: PDBe RCSB |
| PDB | List of PDB id codes 1AP4, 1IH0, 1J1D, 1J1E, 1LXF, 1MXL, 1OZS, 1SPY, 1WRK, 1WRL, 2JT0, 2JT3, 2JT8, 2JTZ, 2JXL, 2KDH, 2KFX, 2KGB, 2KRD, 2L1R, 2L98, 2MKP, 2MLE, 2MLF, 2MZP, 3RV5, 3SD6, 3SWB, 4GJE, 4GJF, 4GJG, 2N79, 4Y99 |

Gene location (Human)
| Chr. | Chromosome 3 (human) |
| Band | 3p21.1 | Start | 52,451,100 bp |
| Band | 3p21.1 | End | 52,454,041 bp |

Gene location (Mouse)
| Chr. | Chromosome 14 (mouse) |
| Band | 14 B|14 19.09 cM | Start | 30,930,269 bp |
| Band | 14 B|14 19.09 cM | End | 30,933,686 bp |
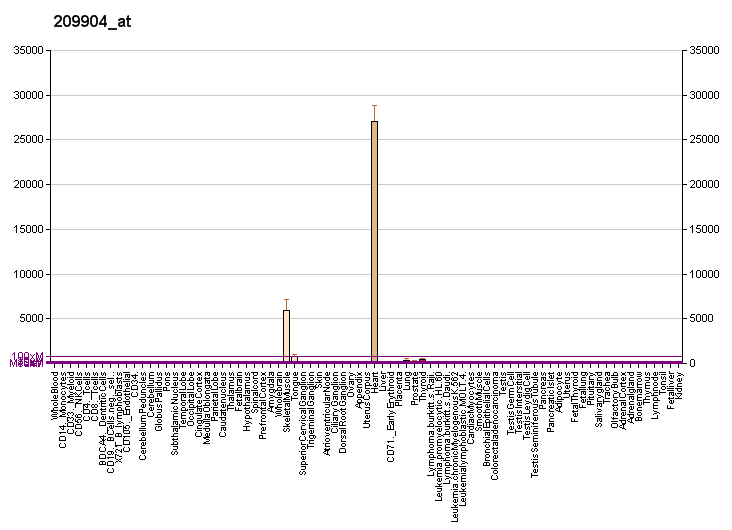
RNA expression pattern
| Bgee | Human / Mouse (ortholog); Top expressed in: glutes; right ventricle; Skeletal muscle tissue of rectus abdominis; triceps brachii muscle; Skeletal muscle tissue of biceps brachii; thoracic diaphragm; myocardium of left ventricle; vastus lateralis muscle; apex of heart; muscle of thigh / Top expressed in: interventricular septum; cardiac muscles; soleus muscle; myocardium of ventricle; cardiac muscle tissue of left ventricle; right ventricle; atrium; ankle; atrioventricular valve; aortic valve; More reference expression data |
| BioGPS | More reference expression data |
Gene ontology
| Molecular function | calcium ion binding; protein homodimerization activity; troponin T binding; metal ion binding; calcium-dependent protein binding; protein binding; troponin I binding; actin filament binding |
| Cellular component | cytosol; troponin complex; contractile fiber; cardiac Troponin complex |
| Biological process | regulation of muscle contraction; transition between fast and slow fiber; diaphragm contraction; response to metal ion; ventricular cardiac muscle tissue morphogenesis; muscle filament sliding; regulation of muscle filament sliding speed; regulation of ATP-dependent activity; skeletal muscle contraction; cardiac muscle contraction |
Sources:Amigo / QuickGO
Orthologs
| Databases | NCBI: entry; OMA: entry |
| Species | Human | Mouse |
| Entrez | 7134 | 21924 |
| Ensembl | ENSG00000114854 | ENSMUSG00000091898 |
| UniProt | P63316 | P19123 |
| RefSeq (mRNA) | NM_003280 | NM_009393 |
| RefSeq (protein) | NP_003271 | NP_033419 |
| Location (UCSC) | Chr 3: 52.45 – 52.45 Mb | Chr 14: 30.93 – 30.93 Mb |
| PubMed search |
- Wikidata
| View/Edit Human | View/Edit Mouse |

Troponin C, slow skeletal and cardiac muscles (TN-C) is a protein encoded in the human by the TNNC1 gene. TN-C resides in the troponin complex on actin thin filaments of striated muscle (slow-twitch cardiac and skeletal) and is responsible for binding calcium to activate muscle contraction. It is one of the two troponin C paralogs in humans.

== Structure ==
Cardiac troponin C (cTnC) is a 161-amino acid protein organized into two domains: the regulatory N-terminal domain (cNTnC, residues 1-86), the structural C-terminal domain (cCTnC, residues 93-161), and a flexible linker connecting the two domains (residues 87-92). Each domain contains two EF-hands, Ca^{2+}-binding helix-loop-helix motifs exemplified by proteins like parvalbumin and calmodulin. In cCTnC the two EF-hand motifs constitute two high affinity Ca^{2+}-binding sites. that are occupied at all physiologically relevant calcium concentrations. In contrast, only the second EF-hand in cNTnC binds Ca^{2+} with low affinity, while the first EF-hand Ca^{2+}-binding site is defunct.

In a typical EF-hand protein like calmodulin, Ca^{2+} binding induces a closed-to-open conformational transition, exposing a large hydrophobic patch in the open state. Likewise, the cardiac troponin regulatory domain, cNTnC, is in a closed conformation in the apo state (no calcium bound). Upon Ca^{2+} binding, cNTnC enters into a rapid equilibrium between closed and open forms, however, the closed form still predominates. The structural domain, cCTnC, exists as a "molten globule" in the apo state, but forms a well structured open conformation in the Ca^{2+}-bound state. These structural differences change the relative stabilities of the apo- and Ca^{2+}-bound states, accounting for the divergent Ca^{2+}-binding affinities between the two domains.

== Function ==
In cardiac muscle, cTnC binds to cardiac troponin I (cTnI) and cardiac troponin T (cTnT), whereas cTnC binds to slow skeletal troponin I (ssTnI) and troponin T (ssTnT) in slow-twitch skeletal muscle.

The structural domain of cTnC (cCTnC) is anchored to troponin I and T, forming the so-called IT arm, made up of cTnC_{93-161}, cTnI_{41-135} and cTnT_{235-286} (in the cardiac complex). cCTnC binds to helical cTnI_{41-60} via its large hydrophobic patch, stabilizing the Ca^{2+}-bound open conformation of cCTnC and enhancing its affinity for Ca^{2+} (from K_{d} = 40 nM to K_{d} = 3 nM). cTnT_{235-286} forms a helical coiled coil with cTnI_{88-135} that binds to the opposite face of cCTnC. The IT arm is anchored to tropomyosin via adjacent segments of cTnT, so it is believed to move as a unit along with tropomyosin throughout the cardiac cycle. In the low calcium environment present during diastole (~100 nM), tropomyosin is anchored into the "blocked" position along the actin thin filament through the binding of the troponin I inhibitory (cTnI_{128-147}) and C-terminal (cTnI_{160-209}) regions. This prevents actin-myosin cross-bridging and effectively shuts off muscle contraction.

As the cytoplasmic Ca^{2+} concentration rises to ~1 μM during systole, Ca^{2+} binding to the regulatory domain of cardiac troponin C (cNTnC) is the key event that leads to muscle contraction. Hydrophobic binding of cNTnC to the "switch" region of troponin I, cTnI_{148-159}, stabilizes the Ca^{2+}-bound open conformation of cNTnC (increasing the Ca^{2+} binding affinity of cNTnC from about K_{d} = 5 μM to K_{d} = 0.8 μM). This binding event removes the adjacent cTnI inhibitory regions from actin and stabilizes tropomyosin in its default "closed" position on the thin filament, allowing actin-myosin cross-bridging and muscle contraction to proceed. Strong actin-myosin interaction can further shift the thin filament into the "open" position.

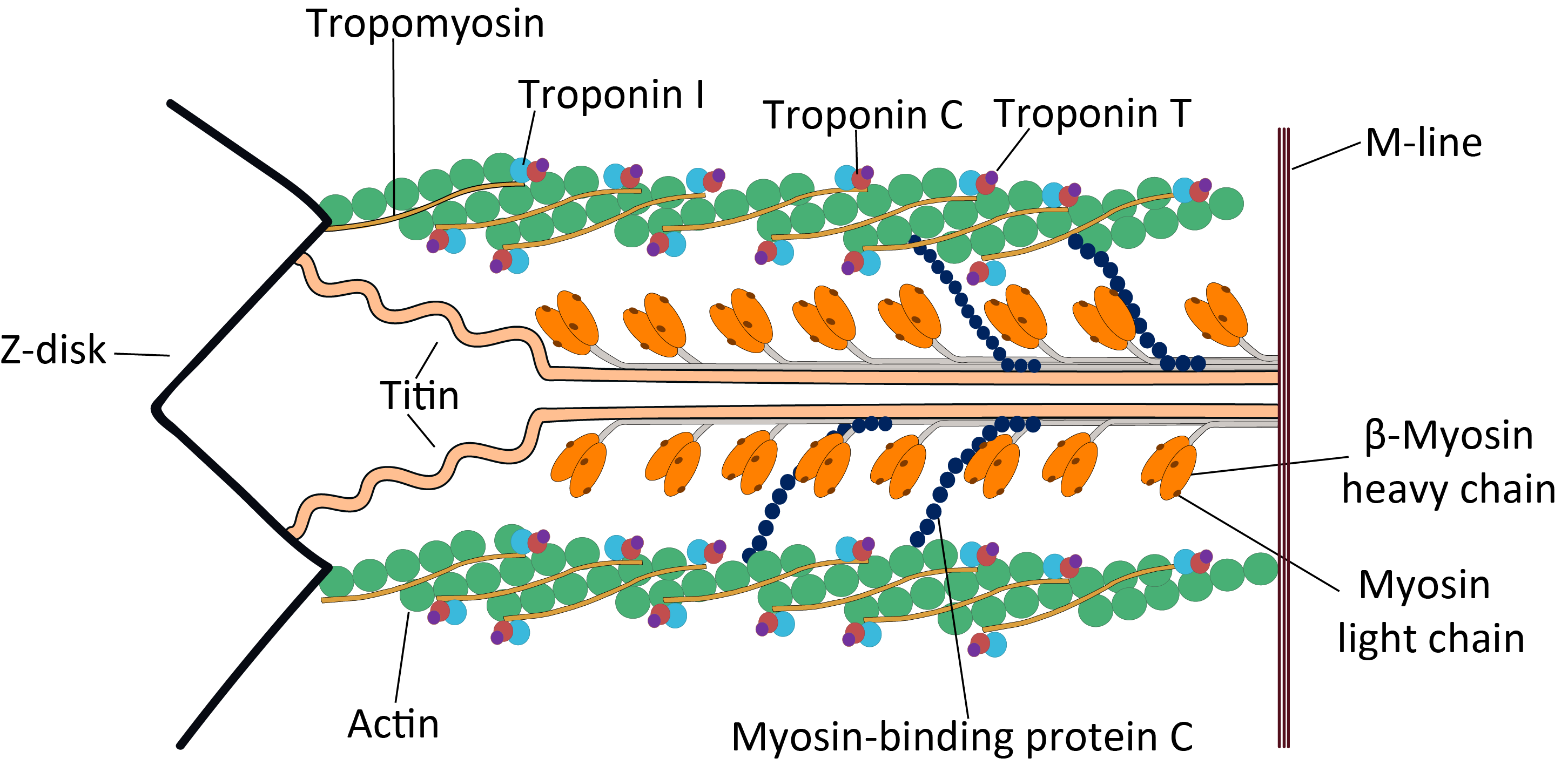
Cardiac sarcomere showing TN-C

== Physiologic regulation of calcium sensitivity ==
The calcium sensitivity of the sarcomere, that is, the calcium concentration at which muscle contraction occurs, is directly determined by the calcium binding affinity of cNTnC. To date, there are no known post-translational modifications of cTnC that impact its calcium binding affinity. However, calcium binding by cNTnC is a dynamic process that can be impacted by the closed-to-open conformational equilibrium of cNTnC, the domain positioning of cNTnC, or the relative availability of cTnI_{148-159}, the physiologic binding partner of cNTnC. The closed-to-open equilibrium of cNTnC can be shifted towards the open state by small compounds (see section below on troponin-binding drugs). Domain positioning of cNTnC can be impacted by phosphorylation of cTnI, of which the most important site in humans is Ser22/Ser23. The availability of cTnI_{148-159} depends on the blocked-closed-open equilibrium of tropomyosin on actin, which can be impacted by any interactions involving the thin filament, including actin-myosin cross-bridging and length dependent activation (also known as stretch activation or the Frank Starling law of the heart). All of these processes can be impacted by mutations (see section below on disease-causing mutations).

== Clinical significance ==
=== Disease-causing mutations ===
Point mutations can occur in cTnC inducing alterations to Ca^{2+} and Mg^{2+} binding and protein structure, leading to abnormalities in muscle contraction. In cardiac muscle, they are related to dilated cardiomyopathy (DCM) and hypertrophic cardiomyopathy (HCM).

These known point mutations are:

- A8V
- D145E
- A31S
- C84Y
- E134D
- Y5H
- I148V

Hypertrophic cardiomyopathy (HCM) is a common condition (prevalence >1:500) characterized by abnormal thickening of the ventricular muscle, classically in the intraventricular septal wall. HCM is described as a disease of the sarcomere, because mutations in the contractile proteins of the sarcomere have been identified in about half of patients with HCM. The cTnC mutations that have been associated with HCM are A8V, L29Q, A31S, C84Y, D145E. In all cases, the mutation was identified in a single patient, so additional genetic testing is needed to confirm or refute the clinical significance of these mutations. With most of these mutations (and with HCM-associated thin filament mutations in general), an increase in cardiac calcium sensitivity has been observed.

Familial dilated cardiomyopathy (DCM) is a rare cause of systolic heart failure (prevalence 1:5000). A wider range of mutations (including some non-sarcomeric proteins as well) is associated with DCM. The cTnC mutations associated with DCM thus far are Y5H, Q50R, D75Y, M103I, D145E (also associated with HCM), I148V, and G159D. Of these, Q50R and G159D co-segregated with disease in affected family members, increasing confidence that they are clinically significant mutations. The biochemical consequences of thin filament DCM-associated mutations are less well established than for HCM, although there has been some suggestion that some of the mutations abolish the calcium desensitizing effect of cTnI phosphorylation at Ser22/23. This may be because some mutations disrupt the precise positioning of cNTnC for triggering muscle contraction when cTnI is unphosphorylated.

=== Drug target ===
Theoretically, a cardiac troponin activator could be useful for increasing cardiac contractility in the treatment of systolic heart failure, whereas a troponin inhibitor could be used to favor relaxation in the treatment of diastolic heart failure. Troponin modulators could also be used to reverse the impact of cardiomyopathy-causing mutations in the thin filament.

Chemical compounds can bind to troponin C to act as troponin activators (calcium sensitizers) or troponin inhibitors (calcium desensitizers). There are already multiple troponin activators that bind to fast skeletal troponin C (TNNC2), of which tirasemtiv has been tested in multiple clinical trials. In contrast, there are no known compounds that bind with high affinity to cardiac troponin C. The calcium sensitizer, levosimendan, is purported to bind to troponin C, but only weak or inconsistent binding has been detected, precluding any structure determination. In contrast, levosimendan inhibits type 3 phosphodiesterase with nanomolar affinity, so its biological target is controversial.

Some compounds have been identified to bind cNTnC with low affinity and act as troponin activators: DFBP-O (a structural analog of levosimendan), 4-(4-(2,5-dimethylphenyl)-1-piperazinyl)-3-pyridinamine (NCI147866), and bepridil. The calmodulin antagonist, W7, has also been found to bind to cNTnC to act as a troponin inhibitor. All of these compounds bind to the hydrophobic patch in the open conformation of cNTnC, with troponin activators promoting interaction with the cTnI switch peptide and troponin inhibitors destabilizing the interaction.

A number of compounds can also bind to cCTnC with low affinity: EMD 57033, resveratrol, bepridil, and EGCG. All of these compounds are renowned for their promiscuity, and the biological significance of these interactions is unknown. In particular, it is unknown how interaction with cCTnC influences the calcium affinity of cNTnC.
