= Retraction (publishing) =

Withdrawing an academic paper as incorrect

In academic publishing, a retraction is a mechanism by which the content of a paper published in an academic journal is disavowed so that its results and conclusions can no longer be relied upon. Retracted articles are not usually removed from the published literature but marked as retracted. In some rare cases a retracted article may be removed from publication, such as if it is defamatory, breaches copyright, violates personal privacy, is the subject of a court order, or might pose a health risk to the public. The purpose of retraction is to correct the literature and ensure its integrity, not to punish the authors. Detailed guideline on retraction have been published. Papers are typically retracted as seriously flawed and essentially incorrect, due to error or misdeeds, as distinct from small corrections to published articles.

Although the majority of retractions in biomedical and life sciences are linked to scientific misconduct, they are often cited as evidence of the self-correcting nature of science. However, some scholars argue this view is misleading, describing it as a myth. A retraction may simply be due to a paper later being found to be in serious error, as in the historical case of Benjamin Wilson's 1756 paper, discussed below.

== Procedure ==
A retraction may be initiated by the editors of a journal, by the author(s) of the paper, or by their institution. Retractions are typically accompanied by a retraction notice written by the editors or authors explaining the reason for the retraction. Such notices may also include a note from the authors with apologies for the previous error and/or expressions of gratitude to persons who disclosed the error to the author.

There have been many cases of retraction of scientific publications. Retraction Watch provides updates on new retractions, and discusses general issues in relation to retractions.

== History ==
The earliest recorded retraction in a scholarly, peer-reviewed scientific publication is "A Retraction, by Mr. Benjamin Wilson, F.R.S. of his former Opinion, concerning the Explication of the Leyden Experiment," published in the Philosophical Transactions of the Royal Society on 24 June 1756. In it, Benjamin Wilson, a British painter and scientist, formally withdrew his previous explanation of the Leyden jar experiment, a foundational study in the field of electricity, on the grounds that subsequent discoveries, particularly those by Benjamin Franklin, had shown his original interpretation to be incorrect.

== Retraction surge ==
A 2011 paper in the Journal of Medical Ethics attempted to quantify retraction rates in PubMed over time to determine if the rate was increasing, even while taking into account the increased number of overall publications occurring each year. The author found that the rate of increase in retractions was greater than the rate of increase in publications. Moreover, the author notes the following:

"It is particularly striking that the number of papers retracted for fraud increased more than sevenfold in the 6 years between 2004 and 2009. During the same period, the number of papers retracted for a scientific mistake did not even double..." (p. 251).

Although the author suggests that his findings may indeed indicate a recent increase in scientific fraud, he also acknowledges other possibilities. For example, increased rates of fraud in recent years may simply indicate that journals are doing a better job of policing the scientific literature than they have in the past. Furthermore, because retractions occur for a very small percentage of overall publications (fewer than 1 in 1,000 articles), a few scientists who are willing to commit large amounts of fraud can highly impact retraction rates. For example, the author points out that Jan Hendrik Schön fabricated results in 15 retracted papers in the dataset he reviewed, all of which were retracted in 2002 and 2003, "so he alone was responsible for 56% of papers retracted for fraud in 2002—2003" (p 252).

During the COVID-19 pandemic, academia had seen a quick increase in fast-track peer-review articles dealing with SARS-CoV-2 problems. As a result, a large number of papers have been retracted due to quality and/or data issues, leading many experts to consider both the quality of peer review, as well as the standards of retraction practices.

Retracted studies may continue to be cited. This may happen in cases where scholars are unaware of the retraction, in particular when the retraction occurs long after the original publication.

The number of journal articles being retracted had risen from about 1,600 in 2013 to 10,000 in 2023. Most of the retractions in 2023 were contributed by Hindawi journals. The significant number of retractions involving Chinese co-authors—over 17,000 since 2021, including 8,000 from Hindawi journals—has led China to launch a nationwide audit addressing retractions and research misconduct. Retractions are also measured among highly cited researchers.

== Alternative versions of retraction ==
=== Retraction with replacement ===
Retraction with replacement, an action historically taken with respect to a low percentage of retracted papers, is a practice newer than simple removal of an article and was developed as a means of correcting error in the scientific record while taking care not to impute to the retracted paper's author(s) any fraudulent or other dishonest intent. Retraction with replacement allows the author to correct their mistakes in the original paper before submitting an edited version to replace it. The journal can then decide to retract the original paper before uploading the corrected version online, usually with a notice on the article page.

=== Self-retraction ===
Self-retraction is a request from a paper's authors to retract their own work from being published. Self-retraction by an author is preferable to a retraction and subsequent investigation from the journal, which may harm the author's reputation; it also shows integrity on the part of the authors.

== Notable retractions ==
=== Retraction for error ===
- 2003 - A study on the relationship between use of the drug ecstasy and dopaminergic neurotoxicity in primates published in Science was retracted, due to methamphetamine unintentionally being used in the experiment instead of ecstasy. See Retracted article on neurotoxicity of ecstasy.
- 2012 - Séralini affair - Article suggesting reported an increase in tumors among rats fed genetically modified corn and the herbicide RoundUp retracted due to criticism of experimental design. According to the editor of the journal, a "more in-depth look at the raw data revealed that no definitive conclusions can be reached with this small sample size".
- 2013 - Study on the Mediterranean diet published in New England Journal of Medicine and widely covered by media was retracted due to unreported non-random assignments. This was part of a larger effort by anesthesiologist John Carlisle to verify proper randomization in thousands of studies; he found problems in about 2% of those analyzed.
- 2025 - A controversial paper claiming that the ancient village of Tall el-Hammam in the Jordan Valley near the Dead Sea was destroyed by a cosmic airburst was retracted by the journal because the evidence did not support the conclusions; the authors maintained their position, and intended to republish the original article with new data.

=== Retraction for fraud or misconduct ===
- 1982 John Darsee fabricated results in the Cardiac Research Laboratory of Eugene Braunwald at Harvard in the early 1980s. He was initially thought to be brilliant by his boss, but was caught out by fellow researchers at the laboratory.
- 1991 Thereza Imanishi-Kari, who worked with David Baltimore, published a 1986 article in the journal Cell on immunology, which showed unexpected results on how the immune system rearranges its genes to produce antibodies against antigens it encounters for the first time. Margot O'Toole, a postdoctoral researcher for Imanishi-Kari, claimed that she could not reproduce Imanishi-Kari's results and alleged that Imanishi-Kari had fabricated the data. After a major investigation, the paper was retracted when the National Institutes of Health concluded that data in the 1986 Imanishi-Kari article had been falsified. Five years later, in 1996, an expert panel appointed by the federal government found no evidence of scientific fraud and cleared Imanishi-Kari of misconduct, but the paper was not reinstated.
- 2002 Retraction of announced discovery of elements 116 and 118. See Livermorium, Victor Ninov.
- 2003 Numerous articles with questionable data from physicist Jan Hendrik Schön were retracted from many journals, including both Science and Nature.
- 2006 Retraction of Patient-specific embryonic stem cells derived from human SCNT blastocysts, written by Hwang Woo-Suk. Fabrications in the field of stem cell research led to 'indictment on embezzlement and bioethics law violations linked to faked stem cell research'.
- 2007 Retraction of several articles written by social psychologist Jennifer Lerner and colleagues from journals including Personality and Social Psychology Bulletin and Biological Psychiatry.
- 2010 A 1998 paper by Andrew Wakefield proposing that the MMR vaccine might cause autism, which was responsible for the MMR vaccine controversy, was retracted because "the claims in the original paper that children were 'consecutively referred' and that investigations were 'approved' by the local ethics committee have been proven to be false."
- 2009 Numerous papers written by Scott Reuben from 1996 to 2009 were retracted after it was discovered he never actually conducted any of the trials he claimed to have run.
- 2011 Eight journal articles authored by Duke University cancer researcher Anil Potti and others, which describe genomic signatures of cancer prognosis and predictors of response to cancer treatment, were retracted in 2011 and 2012. The retraction notices generally state that the results of the analyses described in the articles could not be reproduced. In November 2015, the Office of Research Integrity (ORI) found that Potti had engaged in research misconduct.
- 2014 An article by Haruko Obokata et al. on STAP cells, a method of inducing a cell to become a stem cell, was proven to be falsified. Originally published in Nature, it was retracted later that year. It generated much controversy, and after an institutional investigation, one of the authors committed suicide.
- 2018 Five articles in the field of consumer behavior and marketing research by Brian Wansink at Cornell University came under scrutiny after peers pointed out inconsistencies in the data. Wansink had written a blog post about asking a graduate student to "salvage" conclusions. Cornell University launched an investigation, which determined in 2018 that Wansink had committed academic misconduct; he resigned. Eighteen of Wansink's research papers were later also retracted as similar issues were found in other publications.
- 2019 On 11 April 2019, two articles on DNA damage by Abderrahmane Kaidi of the University of Bristol, one published in Science in 2010 and another in Nature in 2013, were retracted following evidence of data fabrication.
- 2020 On 8 January 2020, Russian journals retracted more than 800 articles after a large-scale investigation conducted by the Russian Academy of Sciences (RAS) following claims of unethical publications.
- 2021 An article studying the open-source community by Qiushi Wu and Kangjie Lu at the University of Minnesota was withdrawn after the Linux Foundation discovered that the researchers had submitted patches for the Linux kernel with intentional bugs and without obtaining appropriate consent.
- 2024 A 2002 article published by Nature, written by Catherine Verfaillie and multiple co-authors, purportedly found that adult bone marrow cells could be used as an alternative to embryonic stem cells. The paper was retracted on 17 June 2024 by the journal as two of the figures had been edited with image manipulation software. Suspicions regarding the paper had been shared since 2006, when several research groups failed to replicate the findings presented; by 2009, two of Verfaillie's other papers had also been retracted due to image manipulation. As of 2025, the article is the most-cited article to have been retracted, with 4,482 citations having been made to the research before it was retracted.
- 2025 An article written by Aidan Toner-Rodgers, a doctoral student of economics at the Massachusetts Institute of Technology (MIT), intended to be published in The Quarterly Journal of Economics, claimed that artificial intelligence had been shown to massively improve efficiency at an unnamed materials science lab. Despite not having been peer-reviewed, the paper, available through ArXiv, enjoyed favourable coverage from outlets such as The Wall Street Journal, The Atlantic, and Nature. In addition, it was praised by MIT economists Daron Acemoglu and David Autor, the former of whom had been co-awarded the Nobel Memorial Prize in Economic Sciences for 2024. The economists were then contacted in January 2025 by a computer scientist with experience in material science, who had disputed the legitimacy of the data, which was followed by an internal review conducted at MIT in early February; the review concluded that the paper was fraudulent, with Toner-Rodgers being expelled from the school. MIT requested that the paper be removed from arXiv. A press release from MIT's economics department issued on 16 May 2025 stated that they "[had] no confidence in the provenance, reliability or validity of the data and [had] no confidence in the veracity of the research contained in the paper," without specifying details. Ben Shindel in his Substack "The BS Detector" speculated that the materials science company mentioned in the paper did not exist as it was implausible that they would provide such a large amount of data to an economics student, in addition to pointing out several instances where the p-values seemed to be unrealistically low. Shindel further doubted Toner-Rodgers's application of a single complex method to analyze the unique qualities of vastly different materials, as well as describing as a "smoking gun" that one of his graphs "looks eerily similar" to one from a 2020 paper on drug analysis.

=== Retraction for ethical violations ===
- 2019 An article by Wendy Rogers (Macquarie University, Australia) and colleagues on BMJ Open called for the mass retraction of more than 400 scientific papers on organ transplantation, due to concerns that the organs had been obtained unethically from Chinese prisoners. Rogers said the journals, researchers and clinicians who used these studies were complicit in these methods of organ trafficking. According to the study, the transplant research community had failed to live up to ethical standards, continuing to publish articles based on use of organs from death row inmates. In 2019, PLOS ONE retracted 21 articles related to this incident.
- 2017 The journal Liver International retracted a Chinese study of liver transplantation because 564 livers grafted in the course of the research over 4 years could not be traced. The experts pointed out that it was implausible a hospital could have so many freely donated livers for transplantation, given the small number of donors in China at the time.

=== Retraction over data provenance ===
- 2020 On 22 May 2020, during the COVID-19 pandemic, an article was published in The Lancet which claimed to find evidence, based on a database of 96032 COVID-19 patients, that hydroxychloroquine and chloroquine increase the chance of patients dying in hospital, and the chance of ventricular arrhythmia. Medical researchers and newspapers expressed suspicions about the validity of the data, provided by Surgisphere, a company founded by one of the authors of the study. The article was formally retracted by 4 June 2020, on request by the lead author Mandeep Mehra.

=== Retraction over public relations issues ===
- 1896 Jose Rizal was said to have issued a letter of retraction regarding his novels and other published articles against the Roman Catholic Church, see José Rizal: Retraction controversy.
- 2016 On 4 March 2016, an article in PLOS ONE about the functioning of the human hand was retracted due to outrage on social media over a reference to "Creator" in the paper, a controversy dubbed CreatorGate.

== See also ==
- Fabrication (science)
- Post-publication peer review
- Scientific misconduct
- Sokal affair
- Erratum
- Research Integrity Risk Index
- Correction (newspaper)
