= Cytokinetics =

California-based biopharmaceutical company

Cytokinetics, Incorporated

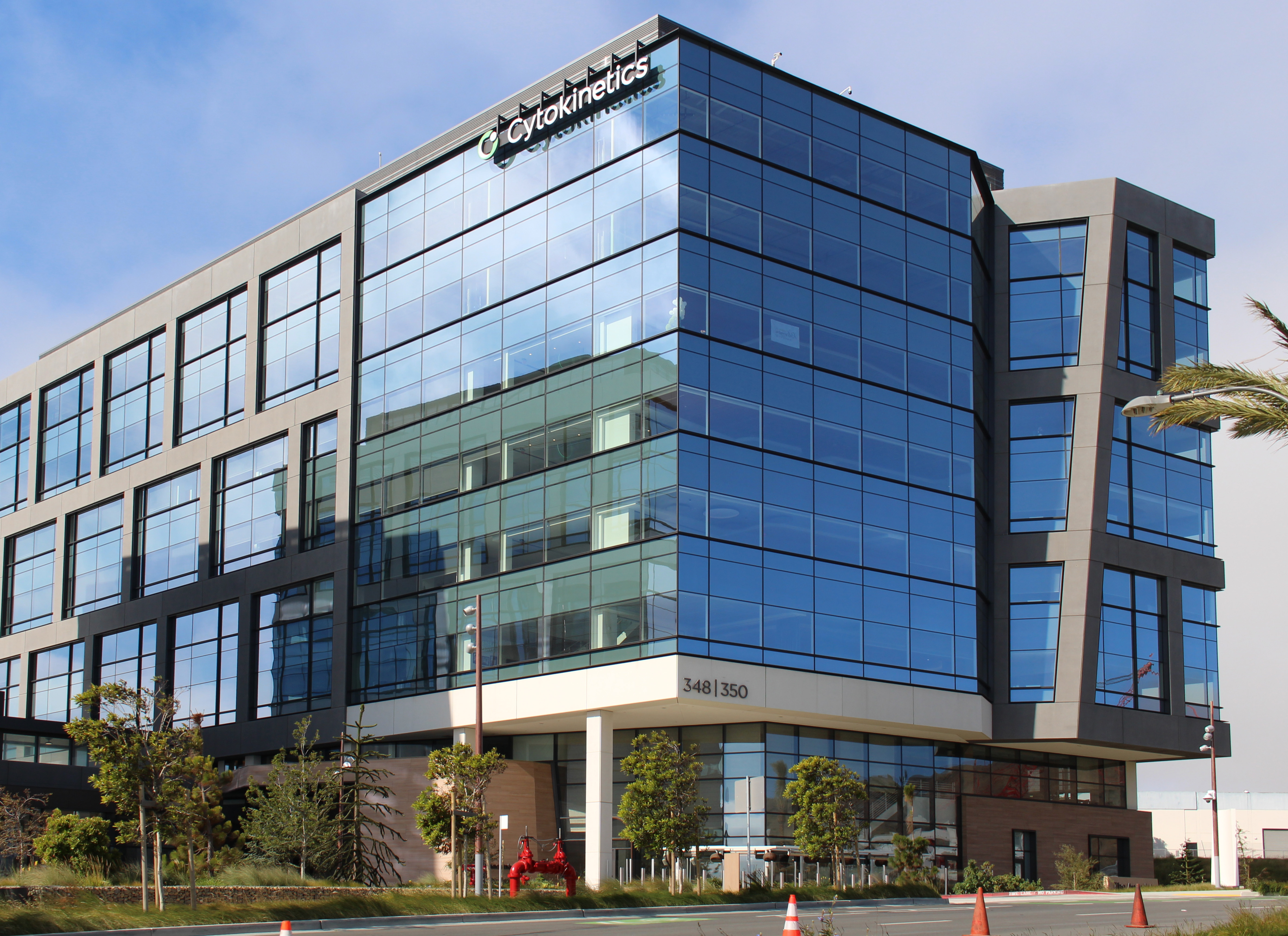
- Headquarters in South San Francisco
- Type: Public
- Traded as: Nasdaq: CYTK; S&P 400 component
- Industry: Biotechnology industry
- Founded: 1997; 29 years ago
- Founders: James Spudich; Ronald Vale; James Sabry; Lawrence S.B. Goldstein
- Headquarters: South San Francisco, California, U.S.
- Key people: Robert Blum (President & CEO); Fady Malik (EVP, Research & Development); Sung Lee (EVP & CFO); Steve Heitner (CMO)
- Products: Omecamtiv mecarbil; MYQUORZO
- Revenue: ▲US$88.04 million (2025)
- Operating income: ▲US$(−612.26 million) (2025)
- Net income: ▲US$(−784.96 million) (2025)
- Total assets: US$1.4 billion (2025)
- Number of employees: 725 (March 2026)
- Website: cytokinetics.com
- Footnotes; Financials as of December 31, 2025.

Cytokinetics, Incorporated, is a biopharmaceutical company based in South San Francisco, California, that develops muscle activators and muscle inhibitors as potential treatments for people with diseases characterized by impaired or declining muscle function.

== History ==
Cytokinetics was founded in 1997 by James Spudich, Ronald Vale, James Sabry and Lawrence S.B. Goldstein, four scientists at Stanford, UCSD, and UCSF. Operations began in 1998.

Initially, Cytokinetics focused on the possible pharmacological targets and areas of application of drugs based on cytoskeletal proteins. Eventually, the company narrowed its focus to the mechanics of muscle biology. Cytokinetics develops muscle activators and muscle inhibitors to improve muscle function in patients with cardiovascular and neuromuscular diseases.

In 2004 the company completed its initial public offering (IPO).

In January 2007, Cytokinetics named Robert I. Blum as president and CEO. Prior to this, Blum has been involved in the company since its founding, with roles in business development, corporate development and R&D.

In 2013, Cytokinetics finalized a licensing and discovery deal with Astellas to research treatment for muscle weakness and fatigue.

In July 2020, Ji Xing Pharmaceuticals signed a financing deal with Cytokinetics, which included the rights to commercialize the drug designed to treat hypertrophic cardiomyopathies, aficamten, in China and certain neighboring regions.

== Products ==
Omecamtiv mecarbil is a cardiac muscle activator for the potential treatment of heart failure. In May 2020, omecamtiv mecarbil was granted fast track designation by the FDA for the treatment of chronic HF with reduced ejection fraction. Amgen purchased an option on omecamtiv mecarbil in 2006, and the two companies extended their partnership several times. In June 2013, Cytokinetics and Amgen expanded their licensing deal for omecamtiv mecarbil to include Japan. In November 2020 Amgen elected to terminate the collaboration, effective May 20, 2021, and Cytokinetics regained worldwide rights to develop and commercialize omecamtiv mecarbil.

Reldesemtiv (previously known as CK-2127107) is a next-generation fast skeletal muscle troponin activator (FSTA) that has undergone clinical trials for ALS.

Aficamten (previously known as CK-3773274) is an oral, small-molecule myosin inhibitor, to treat hypertrophic cardiomyopathy (HCM).
