= Braunwald =

Braunwald may refer to:

- Braunwald (Glarus), a village in the canton of Glarus in Switzerland
- Eugene Braunwald (1929–2026), Austrian-born American cardiologist, husband of Nina Starr Braunwald
- Nina Starr Braunwald (1928–1992), American thoracic surgeon, wife of Eugene Braunwald
