= Kathryn Anderson =

British-American pediatric surgeon

Kathryn Dorothy Duncan Anderson
- Born: 1939 (age 86–87); Ashton-under-Lyne, Lancashire, England
- Citizenship: American
- Occupation: Pediatric Surgeon
- Spouse: William French Anderson (m. 1962)

Kathryn Dorothy Duncan Anderson (born 1939) is a British-American pediatric surgeon. She was the first woman elected president of the American College of Surgeons and the first woman president of the American Pediatric Surgical Association. She was a Nina Starr Braunwald Award laureate.

== Early life ==
Kathryn Anderson was born Kathryn Dorothy Duncan in Ashton-under-Lyne, Lancashire, England in 1939. With encouragement from her parents, she knew that she wanted to become a surgeon at the age of 8. She began studying at Cambridge University in 1958, and went on to earn a bachelor and masters of arts from the university. She met French Anderson, an American, in an anatomy class while at Cambridge University. In 1962 they married and moved to the United States.

After moving to the US, Anderson continued studying medicine in 1964 at Harvard Medical School. Upon graduating, the dean denied her a surgical internship, saying women were too weak to be surgeons. She ended up completing an internship in pediatric medicine at Boston Children's Hospital. A year later, in 1965, she moved to Washington, D.C., and completed her general surgical residency at Georgetown University Hospital. Over the two years she was at Georgetown University Hospital, she was only assigned seven cases. Believing that discrimination against her gender was affecting her training, Anderson left the hospital and began working in various community hospitals. In these hospitals, she worked on 700 cases in the first year. In 1973, she gained American citizenship.

== Career ==
Anderson has had multiple academic appointments over the course of her career. Anderson joined Children's National Medical Center for a two-year fellowship in pediatric surgery in 1970. She also became chair of the surgery department at Children's National Medical Center. From 1972 to 1974, she was an assistant professor of surgery and pediatrics at Georgetown University. She then worked at George Washington University, where she stayed for eighteen years. She started as an assistant professor, became an associate professor in 1978, and a professor in 1983. She worked as an adjunct scientist in the molecular hematology branch of the National Heart, Lung & Blood Institute of the National Institutes of Health from 1984 to 1992. In 1985 and 1986, Anderson served as chair of the surgery section of the American Academy of Pediatrics, and in 1986 she began serving on the editorial board of the Journal of Pediatric Surgery, as well as numerous other medical journals.

In 1992, Anderson was named surgeon-in-chief and vice president of surgery at Children's Hospital in Los Angeles, California. The same year, she became secretary and the first woman officer of the American College of Surgeons. From 1999 to 2000, she served as the first woman president of the American Pediatric Surgical Association. One major area of research interest from 1972 to 2004 was esophageal replacement in children and infants.

Anderson was featured in Changing the Face of Medicine: Celebrating America's Women Physicians, for which a National Institutes of Health exhibition was open from October 2003 to April 2005. She wrote a book in 2009 entitled Who Will Hold My Hand?: A Guide For Parents Whose Child Needs An Operation, which aims to help parents understand medical conditions and the medical system and is based on Anderson's training, personal experiences, and research.

Over the course of her career, Anderson was a practicing pediatric surgeon for 32 years in Washington, D.C. and Los Angeles, California.

== Awards and honors ==
- 1995, Nina Starr Braunwald Award from the Association of Women Surgeons
- 1999, lifetime fellowship in Royal College of Surgeons of England.
- 2005, Honorary Fellow of the Royal College of Surgeons of Ireland
- 2007, Honorary Fellow of the Royal College of Surgeons of Edinburgh
