= Gerard M. Doherty =

Surgeon and professor at Harvard Medical School

- Education: College of the Holy Cross (BA); Yale University (MD)
- Scientific career
- Fields: Surgery, endocrine surgery, surgical oncology
- Workplaces: Harvard Medical School; Brigham and Women's Hospital; Mass General Brigham; Boston University; Boston Medical Center; University of Michigan; Washington University School of Medicine

Gerard Michael Doherty is an American physician-scientist known for his research in endocrine surgery. He is the Moseley Professor of Surgery at Harvard Medical School and surgeon-in-chief at Brigham and Women's Hospital and Mass General Brigham Cancer. In June 2025, he also became chair of the Department of Surgery at Mass General Brigham.

Doherty's clinical work has focused on disorders of the thyroid, parathyroid, endocrine pancreas, and adrenal glands, as well as the surgical treatment of multiple endocrine neoplasia syndromes.

== Education ==
Doherty graduated from the College of the Holy Cross with a Bachelor of Arts in chemistry with honors in 1982. As an undergraduate at Holy Cross, he completed a senior thesis titled, Synthesis and Characterization of an Immobilized Fluorescent Ligand for the Detection of Al (III). He then earned his Doctor of Medicine (M.D.) from the Yale School of Medicine in 1986.

After medical school, Doherty completed a surgical internship at the University of California, San Francisco from 1986 to 1987. He continued his general surgery residency at UCSF from 1987 to 1989. From 1989 to 1991, he was a medical staff fellow at the National Cancer Institute, where he completed training in surgical oncology. He then returned to UCSF and completed the remainder of his general surgery residency from 1991 to 1993.

== Academic career ==
Doherty joined the faculty of Washington University School of Medicine in 1993 and was promoted to professor of surgery in 2001. While at Washington University, he participated in clinical trials at the Siteman Cancer Center.

From 2002 to 2012, Doherty was the Norman W. Thompson Professor of Surgery at the University of Michigan. At Michigan, he served as head of general surgery and as a director of the surgical training program. He also conducted clinical trials through the University of Michigan Cancer Center. In 2012, Doherty became the James Utley Professor and chair of surgery at the Boston University School of Medicine and surgeon-in-chief at Boston Medical Center. He remained in those positions until 2016. In August 2016, Brigham and Women's Hospital announced that Doherty would become chair of its Department of Surgery effective October 1 of that year. He subsequently became the Moseley Professor of Surgery at Harvard Medical School and the Crowley Family Endowed Chair of the Department of Surgery at Brigham and Women's Hospital. He has served as surgeon-in-chief at Brigham and Women's Hospital since 2016.

On June 1, 2025, Doherty became chair of the Department of Surgery for the Mass General Brigham health system. The systemwide position placed him at the head of surgical services across Mass General Brigham, whose hospitals include Massachusetts General Hospital and Brigham and Women's Hospital.

Doherty was elected president of the American Association of Endocrine Surgeons in 2014 and served as president through 2015. He subsequently served as a past president of both the American Association of Endocrine Surgeons and the International Association of Endocrine Surgeons. He has also served as a past president of the Society of Surgical Chairs.

Doherty is the review editor of JAMA Surgery. He has also served as editor-in-chief of McGraw Hill's AccessSurgery.

== Research ==
Doherty was trained in surgical oncology and has concentrated much of his practice on endocrine surgery. His clinical practice has included surgery for diseases of the thyroid, parathyroid glands, endocrine pancreas, and adrenal glands and for multiple endocrine neoplasia syndromes. His more recent clinical practice has been particularly focused on thyroid and parathyroid disease, including thyroid cancer.

Doherty began his laboratory research in the 1990s with studies of interferon gamma, cytokines, and tumor necrosis factor alpha in tumors. His research later shifted toward clinical and translational studies of endocrine tumors, including pancreatic neuroendocrine tumors, adrenocortical carcinoma, hyperparathyroidism, and multiple endocrine neoplasia type 1. He has also participated in the development of consensus statements and clinical guidelines concerning endocrine tumors.

Doherty was a co-author of the American Association of Endocrine Surgeons' 2016 guidelines for the definitive management of primary hyperparathyroidism. He was also a co-author of the association's 2020 guidelines for the surgical management of thyroid disease in adults.

Doherty has more than 400 peer-reviewed articles, reviews, and book chapters, in addition to several edited books. He is the editor of the sixteenth edition of Current Diagnosis & Treatment: Surgery, published by McGraw Hill.

== Honors ==
In 2025, the Faculty of Medicine at Uppsala University awarded Doherty an honorary doctorate.

== Selected publications ==
- Doherty, Gerard M. "General surgery as a foundation: How to build successful careers in (endocrine) surgery: Presidential Address." Surgery. 2016;159(1):1–6. doi:10.1016/j.surg.2015.06.065.
- Wilhelm, Scott M.; Wang, Tracy S.; Ruan, Daniel T.; et al. "The American Association of Endocrine Surgeons Guidelines for Definitive Management of Primary Hyperparathyroidism." JAMA Surgery. 2016;151(10):959–968. doi:10.1001/jamasurg.2016.2310.
- Patel, Kepal N.; Yip, Linwah; Lubitz, Carrie C.; et al. "The American Association of Endocrine Surgeons Guidelines for the Definitive Surgical Management of Thyroid Disease in Adults." Annals of Surgery. 2020;271(3):e21–e93. doi:10.1097/SLA.0000000000003580.
- Doherty, Gerard M., ed. Current Diagnosis & Treatment: Surgery. 16th ed. McGraw Hill.
