= Patricia Numann =

American endocrine surgeon

- Born: April 6, 1941 (age 85)
- Education: University of Rochester (BA); State University of New York Upstate Medical University (MD)
- Scientific career
- Fields: Endocrine surgery
- Workplaces: State University of New York Upstate Medical University

Patricia Joy Numann (born April 6, 1941) is an American endocrine surgeon. She is the founder of the Association of Women Surgeons, former president of the American College of Surgeons, and professor emeritus at the State University of New York Upstate Medical University.

== Early life ==
Numann was born in New York City on April 6, 1941, but moved to rural New York as a young child when her father lost his job in the city. She grew up in Denver, New York, a small town in the Catskill Mountains, and attended Roxbury Central School in Roxbury, New York. As a teenager, she worked as a nurse's aide in a hospital, and went on to study an undergraduate degree in science at the University of Rochester. She completed a medical degree at the State University of New York Upstate Medical University in 1965, and after her internship she completed her residency in general surgery from 1966 to 1970.

== Career ==
Numann joined the faculty of SUNY Upstate Medical University in 1970 as an assistant professor of surgery and the university's first female surgeon. She was promoted to an associate professor in 1975. From 1978 to 1984, she was an associate dean of the university's college of medicine. She became a professor of surgery in 1989 and was appointed the Lloyd S. Rogers Professor of Surgery in 2000, a position which she held until her retirement in 2007, when she became a professor emeritus. After her retirement, SUNY Upstate established the Patricia J. Numann Chair of Surgery, the university's first endowed chair for a woman.

Numann held appointments at Crouse-Irving Memorial Hospital (as a consulting surgeon, 1970–2006), the Syracuse Veteran's Affairs Hospital (staff surgeon, 1970–2007), and SUNY Upstate University Hospital (attending surgeon, 1989–2007). She specialized in endocrine surgery, mainly treating thyroid disease, parathyroid disease and breast disease, and wrote about these procedures in medical textbook chapters and journal articles. In 2007, she founded the Patricia J. Numann Breast & Endocrine Surgery Center at SUNY Upstate Medical University.

Numann has been involved in numerous professional organizations. She became a fellow of the American College of Surgeons in 1974 and received its highest honor, the Distinguished Service Award, in 2006. She was appointed president of the college in 2011, making her the second woman to hold that position. She founded the Association of Women Surgeons in 1982 and served as the association's president in 1986–1987. She was the first woman chair of the American Board of Surgery, a position that she held from 1994 to 2002. She co-founded the Association for Surgical Education, and her election as president in 1985 made her the first woman president of any national surgical organization in the United States.

=== Awards and honors ===
Numann's awards and honors include the New York State Woman of Distinction in Medicine Award (1994), the Nina Starr Braunwald Award of the Association of Women Surgeons (1998), the Distinguished Service Award of the Susan G. Komen Breast Cancer Foundation (2001), the Elizabeth Blackwell Medal of the American Medical Women's Association (2006), and ISS Prize of the International Society of Surgery (2011). She was made an honorary fellow of the Royal College of Physicians and Surgeons of Glasgow and the Royal College of Surgeons of Edinburgh in 2011 and 2012 respectively. In 2012, she was awarded an honorary Doctor of Science degree by SUNY Upstate Medical University. In 2019, she received the American College of Surgeons Lifetime Achievement Award at the Clinical Congress 2019 Convocation, October 27 in San Francisco, CA.
