= Andrew G. Morrow =

American surgeon (1922–1982)

Andrew G. Morrow (1922 – 12 August 1982) was an American cardiac surgeon. He was the chief of surgery at the National Heart Institute, who established the septal myectomy operation for obstructive hypertrophic cardiomyopathy (HCM). In 1960 he was part of the team that performed the first successful human mitral valve replacement using Nina Starr Braunwald's design.

Morrow is named in the cardiac sign Brockenbrough-Braunwald-Morrow sign. His procedure for correcting HCM became known as the Morrow operation.
