= Stone heart =

Stone heart may refer to:

- Stone heart syndrome
- Stoneheart trilogy
