= John Darsee =

American physician

John Roland Darsee (born c. 1948 in Huntington, West Virginia) is an American physician and former medical researcher. After compiling an impressive list of publications in reputable scientific journals, he was found to have fabricated data for his publications.

== Education and research career ==
John Darsee obtained his undergraduate education at the University of Notre Dame, then went to medical school at Indiana University, where he received a degree in 1974.

Darsee had an excellent reputation as a student and medical researcher. He worked at Emory University from 1974 to 1979, serving as chief medical resident at Grady Memorial Hospital. He then moved to Harvard University, where he worked as research fellow at the Cardiac Research Laboratory. Darsee produced 5 major papers in his first 15 months at Harvard. The head of his lab, cardiologist Eugene Braunwald, considered Darsee the most remarkable of the 130 fellows who had worked in his lab and offered Darsee a faculty position at Harvard in 1981. Some of Darsee's colleagues became concerned about the accuracy of Darsee's results. They went to the lab director, Robert Kloner, with their suspicions. Kloner investigated and found that Darsee had been altering dates on his laboratory work to make a few hours' work appear to be several weeks of data. When informed, Braunwald terminated Darsee's fellowship but did not inform the National Institutes of Health (NIH), which was funding the research, of Darsee's misconduct at the time.

Braunwald and Kloner conducted their own investigation into Darsee's work and found no other evidence of fraud; nor did a committee of Harvard faculty appointed by the Dean of the medical school. However, in October 1981 discrepancies between Darsee's data and those collected by other centers performing similar work triggered a formal investigation by the NIH. The NIH review found that Darsee had committed wide-ranging scientific misconduct, fabricating large amounts of data from experiments which he had never conducted. Harvard's investigation, as well as that of Braunwald and Kloner, were criticized for being inadequately rigorous and for reporting that they had "fully reviewed" data which later turned out to be non-existent. Darsee was barred by the NIH from receiving federal research funding for 10 years. Brigham and Women's Hospital, affiliated with Harvard, had to return $122,371 in research funds to NIH. This was the first time an institution was required to return money to NIH because of research fraud.

== Wider misconduct ==
Over time, more research by Darsee came under fire. Investigations revealed that Darsee had previously used false data between 1966 and 1970, while an undergraduate at the University of Notre Dame. Following the NIH investigation, Harvard retracted 30 of Darsee's papers and abstracts in February 1983. Review of Darsee's earlier work at Emory University led to the retraction of an additional 52 papers and abstracts published during his tenure there. Braunwald drew criticism for lax supervision and for creating "a hurried pace and emphasis on productivity, coupled with limited interaction with senior scientists", which contributed to the ease with which Darsee was able to fabricate data. Arnold Relman, editor of The New England Journal of Medicine, also criticized Darsee's coauthors for their unfamiliarity with his work and lack of awareness of the scientific misconduct.

== Aftermath ==
Darsee maintained that he had "no recollection" of committing research fraud. He issued an apology which was printed in The New England Journal of Medicine, writing: "I am deeply sorry for allowing these inaccuracies and falsehoods to be published in the Journal and apologize to the editorial board and readers." Darsee asked "forgiveness for whatever I have done wrong."

Darsee subsequently entered a clinical fellowship in critical care at Ellis Hospital in Schenectady, New York. He worked there until June 1983. In 1984 the New York State Board of Regents revoked his license to practice medicine in the state of New York. He is now working as a medical writer and blogger under the name of John Hughes-Darsee and living with his wife, Linda Hughes, a surgical nurse, and two children in West Nyack, New York.

== See also ==
- List of scientific misconduct incidents
