= Septal myectomy =

- Specialty: Cardiology, cardiothoracic surgery

Septal myectomy is a cardiac surgery treatment for hypertrophic cardiomyopathy (HCM). The open-heart surgery entails removing a portion of the septum that is obstructing the flow of blood from the left ventricle to the aorta.

The most common alternatives to septal myectomies are treatment with medication (usually beta or calcium blockers) or non-surgical thinning of tissue with alcohol ablation. Ordinarily, septal myectomies are performed only after attempts at treatment with medication fail. The choice between septal myectomy and alcohol ablation is a complex medical decision.

Septal myectomy was established by Andrew G. Morrow in the 1960s.

== Outcomes ==
Septal myectomy is associated with a low perioperative mortality and a high late survival rate. A study at the Mayo Clinic found surgical myectomy performed to relieve outflow obstruction and severe symptoms in HCM was associated with long-term survival equivalent to that of the general population, and superior to obstructive HCM without operation. The results are shown below:

Survival (all-cause mortality) *
Years	With surgery	Without surgery
1	98%	90%
5	96%	79%
10	83%	61%

Survival (HCM-related death)
Years	With surgery	Without surgery
1	99%	94%
5	98%	89%
10	95%	73%

Survival (sudden cardiac death)
Years	With surgery	Without surgery
1	100%	97%
5	99%	93%
10	99%	89%

* Includes 0.8% operative mortality.

== Comparison with alcohol ablation ==
Either alcohol ablation or myectomy offers substantial clinical improvement for patients with hypertrophic obstructive cardiomyopathy. One non-randomized comparison suggested that hemodynamic resolution of the obstruction and its sequelae are more complete with myectomy. Whether one or the other treatment is preferable for certain patient types is debated among cardiovascular scientists.
