= Stone heart syndrome =

Medical condition

Stone heart syndrome, also called ischemic myocardial contracture, is a rare and severe condition characterized by extreme rigidity and hardness of the heart muscle. This condition typically occurs during high-risk situations such as heart surgery or following a severe heart attack, often leading to life-threatening complications. In stone heart syndrome, the heart's inability to contract and pump blood effectively can result in a drastic reduction in blood flow and oxygen delivery throughout the body.

== History ==
Stone heart syndrome was first identified by Denton Cooley in 1972. It is a rare cardiac condition that initially puzzled medical experts. Primarily observed in patients undergoing heart surgery or experiencing severe heart attacks, this syndrome is characterized by a stress response in the heart muscle. While precise prevalence data are limited, stone heart syndrome predominantly affects individuals over 50 years of age, particularly those with pre-existing cardiac issues. The condition's rarity and its occurrence mainly in surgical settings or following major cardiac events have made it a subject of ongoing research and clinical interest in the field of cardiology.

== Signs and symptoms ==
Ischemic myocardial contracture primarily manifests as a sudden onset of severe cardiac rigidity, often leading to a rapid decline in cardiovascular function. Immediate symptoms typically include a sharp drop in blood pressure, fainting, breathing difficulties, and an irregular or absent pulse. These signs indicate that the heart is unable to pump blood effectively due to its rigid state. If the patient survives the initial episode, long-term effects may involve weakened heart muscle, chronic fatigue, and possible permanent heart damage.

== Cause ==
The cause of stone heart syndrome (ischemic myocardial contracture) lies in a combination of physiological and biochemical mechanisms triggered by extreme stress on the heart muscle. This rare condition typically occurs during high-risk situations such as open-heart surgery or following severe heart attacks. A key driver is the disruption of calcium homeostasis within the heart muscle cells (cardiomyocytes). During ischemic events, an overload of intracellular calcium can occur, leading to sustained contraction of the heart muscle. This condition is further exacerbated by depleted adenosine triphosphate (ATP) levels, which impair the ability of cardiomyocytes to relax. The resulting hypercontracted state renders the heart rigid and unable to pump blood effectively, resembling rigor mortis in striated muscles. Factors such as ischemia-reperfusion injury, myocardial hypertrophy, and metabolic imbalances can amplify these effects.

Additional contributors include structural and biochemical abnormalities in the myocardium. Chronic conditions like congestive heart failure or longstanding aortic valve disease may predispose individuals to stone heart syndrome by causing myocardial hypertrophy and fibrosis. During surgical procedures, rapid reoxygenation after ischemia can trigger calcium overload-induced contracture or rigor contracture, both of which lead to irreversible stiffness. Experimental studies suggest that hypercontractility arises from increased calcium sensitivity of myofibrils and persistent myosin-actin cross-bridge attachment within sarcomeres. These cellular changes are often accompanied by contraction band necrosis and mitochondrial swelling, which further compromise cardiac function. Preventive measures such as hypothermia, calcium antagonists, beta-blockers, and advanced surgical techniques aim to minimize myocardial stress and mitigate these pathological processes.

== Pathophysiology ==
The pathophysiology of stone heart syndrome involves a complex interplay of cellular and molecular mechanisms. The primary driver is an abnormal increase in intracellular calcium within the heart muscle cells (cardiomyocytes). This calcium overload disrupts the normal contraction-relaxation cycle of the heart muscle.

Under normal conditions, calcium enters cardiomyocytes during electrical excitation, triggering contraction. The calcium is then quickly removed from the cytoplasm, allowing the muscle to relax. In stone heart syndrome, this delicate balance is disrupted. The excessive influx or release of calcium from intracellular stores overwhelms the cell's ability to remove it, leading to a sustained contraction state.

This prolonged contraction causes the heart muscle to become extremely rigid, resembling stone - hence the syndrome's name. The rigidity prevents the heart chambers from filling properly and ejecting blood effectively, leading to a rapid decline in cardiac output and systemic perfusion^{.}

The exact trigger for this calcium overload can vary. In surgical settings, it may be related to ischemia-reperfusion injury, where the restoration of blood flow after a period of ischemia paradoxically leads to cellular damage. In the context of severe heart attacks, the massive cell death and subsequent inflammatory response may contribute to the disruption of calcium homeostasis.

Additionally, the syndrome may involve other factors such as ATP depletion, which further impairs the cell's ability to regulate calcium levels, and alterations in the contractile proteins themselves, making them more sensitive to calcium or resistant to relaxation.

== Risk factors and diagnosis ==
Stone heart syndrome primarily affects individuals undergoing complex heart surgery, those with a history of severe heart disease, older patients, and those with weakened heart muscles. Myocardial hypertrophy has also been identified as a risk factor. Diagnosis is typically made by cardiologists or cardiac surgeons, especially in surgical settings. Diagnostic tests include echocardiograms to assess heart muscle movement, electrocardiograms to detect irregular heart rhythms, and blood tests for markers of heart damage. The syndrome's sudden onset, usually during surgery or after severe heart attacks, makes rapid diagnosis crucial yet challenging.

== Treatment or management ==
The management of stone heart syndrome focuses on prevention and emergency interventions. Preventive measures include advanced surgical techniques to reduce heart muscle strain and improved blood flow and oxygen support during surgery. If stone heart syndrome occurs, emergency measures such as extracorporeal membrane oxygenation (ECMO) may be used to maintain blood flow and oxygenation. Recent research has explored the potential of myosin inhibitors, such as MYK-461 (Mavacamten), in preventing or delaying the onset of stone heart during warm ischemia.

== Prognosis and outcomes ==
The prognosis for patients with stone heart syndrome is generally poor due to the sudden and severe nature of the condition. Survival often depends on immediate recognition and intervention. Those who survive may face lasting heart damage and reduced physical stamina. However, with swift medical intervention, some patients have shown significant recovery.

== Research directions ==
Current research on stone heart syndrome focuses on refining surgical techniques and developing drugs to control calcium levels within heart cells. A 2023 study in the pig heart model demonstrated that rapid cooling and a cardioplegic solution containing a myosin inhibitor could effectively prevent and reverse ischemic contracture. This research provides new insights into potential preventive strategies for stone heart syndrome during cardiac surgery.

The study also revealed that stone heart syndrome is associated with a decrease in adenosine triphosphate (ATP) and phosphocreatine levels by about 50%. Electron microscopy showed deteriorated structure with contraction bands, Z-line streaming, and swollen mitochondria. Synchrotron-based small-angle X-ray scattering of trabecular samples from stone hearts revealed attachment of myosin to actin, without volume changes in the sarcomeres.

These findings suggest that stone heart syndrome is a hypercontracted state associated with myosin binding to actin and increased Ca2+ sensitivity. The hypercontractile state, once developed, is poorly reversible. The myosin inhibitor MYK-461, which is clinically approved for other indications, could be a promising avenue for prevention.
