= Beth Sutton =

American surgeon

- Education: Baylor University
- Scientific career
- Fields: General surgery

Beth H. Sutton is an American general surgeon who is the president-elect of the American College of Surgeons. She hopes to place a greater focus on specialists in the surgical field and how their distinctive qualities can help to improve patient care.

== Early life and education ==
Sutton developed an early interest in medicine after receiving a book about the human body from her great-aunt when she was a young girl. The book, which included detailed pictures and descriptions, sparked her fascination with healthcare. Sutton earned a M.D. from Baylor College of Medicine in 1976. She completed a residency at Baylor Scott & White Medical Center – Temple. She did an internship at the St. Paul Hospital at the University of Texas Southwestern Medical Center.

Sutton works as a general surgeon in private practice in Wichita Falls, Texas. In 1984, she was elected a fellow of the American College of Surgeons (ACS). Sutton has experience performing gallbladder surgeries. She was president Association of Women Surgeons in 1999. From 2004 to 2010, she was the governor-at-large of the ACS North Texas Chapter. In 2007, she served as the president of the Texas Surgical Society. Sutton was a member of the ACS board of governors executive committee from 2008 to 2010. She was a member of the ACS board of regents from 2012 to 2021 and served as its chair. On October 25, 2023, she was named the ACS president-elect. She succeeded Henri Ford in 2024, serving until late 2025 as the ACS president, after which she was in turn succeeded by Anton N Sidaway. Sutton is a director of the American Board of Surgery and has served as the president of both the Texas Surgical Society and the Association of Women Surgeons.
