= Mavacamten =

Pharmaceutical drug

Clinical data
- Trade names: Camzyos
- Other names: MYK-461
- AHFS/Drugs.com: Monograph
- MedlinePlus: a622047
- License data: US DailyMed: Mavacamten
- Pregnancy category: AU: D
- Routes of administration: By mouth
- Drug class: Cardiac myosin inhibitor
- ATC code: C01EB24 (WHO)

Legal status
- Legal status: AU: S4 (Prescription only); BR: Class C1 (Other controlled substances); CA: ℞-only; US: ℞-only; EU: Rx-only; In general: ℞ (Prescription only)

Identifiers
- IUPAC name: 6-[[(1S)-1-phenylethyl]amino]-3-propan-2-yl-1H-pyrimidine-2,4-dione
- CAS Number: 1642288-47-8
- PubChem CID: 117761397
- IUPHAR/BPS: 11265
- DrugBank: DB14921
- ChemSpider: 57876199
- UNII: QX45B99R3J
- KEGG: D12265
- ChEMBL: ChEMBL4297517
- ECHA InfoCard: 100.269.298

Chemical and physical data
- Formula: C_{15}H_{19}N_{3}O_{2}
- Molar mass: 273.336 g·mol^{−1}
- 3D model (JSmol): Interactive image
- SMILES: CC(C)N1C(=O)NC(N[C@@H](C)C2=CC=CC=C2)=CC1=O
- InChI: InChI=1S/C15H19N3O2/c1-10(2)18-14(19)9-13(17-15(18)20)16-11(3)12-7-5-4-6-8-12/h4-11,16H,1-3H3,(H,17,20)/t11-/m0/s1; Key:RLCLASQCAPXVLM-NSHDSACASA-N

Mavacamten, sold under the brand name Camzyos, is a medication used to treat obstructive hypertrophic cardiomyopathy.

Mavacamten is a small-molecule allosteric cardiac myosin inhibitor. It was developed by MyoKardia, a subsidiary of Bristol Myers Squibb. In clinical studies, mavacamten has demonstrated significant efficacy in reducing cardiac muscle contractility by targeting the sarcomere hypercontractility that is one of the characteristics of hypertrophic cardiomyopathy and inhibits excessive myosin actin cross-bridge formation, shifting the overall myosin population towards an energy-sparing, recruitable, super-relaxed state.

Mavacamten was approved for medical use in the United States in April 2022. The US Food and Drug Administration (FDA) considers it to be a first-in-class medication.

== Medical uses ==
Mavacamten is indicated for the treatment of people weighing at least 30 kg (66 lb) with symptomatic New York Heart Association class II-III obstructive hypertrophic cardiomyopathy to improve functional capacity and symptoms.

== Adverse effects ==
The US prescribing information for mavacamten contains a boxed warning regarding heart failure. Mavacamten reduces the left ventricular ejection fraction (LVEF) and can cause heart failure due to systolic dysfunction.

== History ==
Mavacamten was granted orphan drug designation by the US Food and Drug Administration (FDA).

== Society and culture ==
=== Legal status ===
In April 2023, the Committee for Medicinal Products for Human Use of the European Medicines Agency adopted a positive opinion, recommending the granting of a marketing authorization for the medicinal product Camzyos, intended for the treatment of symptomatic obstructive hypertrophic cardiomyopathy (oHCM). The applicant for this medicinal product is Bristol-Myers Squibb Pharma EEIG. In June 2023, the European Commission approved Mavacamten.

Mavacamten is approved for medical use in the US, Canada, Australia, South Korea, Singapore, Switzerland, Brazil and Macau.

=== Names ===
Mavacamten is the international nonproprietary name (INN).
