= D145E =

Point mutation

D145E is a point mutation on troponin C that leads to hypertrophic cardiomyopathy disease. This mutation is caused by the change of nucleotide C to A at nucleotide 435, switching the amino acid aspartic acid to glutamic acid, which is located at the C-terminal tail. Patients with this mutation have different structure on the thin filament and alter the binding of Ca^{2+} at the troponin C site IV. Further, D145E causes increase in development of force and activation of ATPase in the presence of Ca^{2+}.
