= A8V =

A8V is point mutation on Troponin C (cTNC) that leads to a hypertrophic cardiomyopathy. The coordinated cardiac muscle contraction is regulated by the troponin complex on thin filament (troponin C which is calcium binding, troponin T that plays the role with tropomyosin, and troponin I which has an inhibitory action annulating the S1 ATPase activity in the presence of tropomyosin and troponin and absence of Ca^{2+}). This mutation is determined by the change of Alanine to Valine at nucleotide 23 from C to T. Patients with this type of mutation shows thickness on the left ventricle wall of around 18 mm, compared to the normal this thickness would be 12 mm. Also, A8V affects the Ca^{2+} binding affinity compared to normal genotype and increased sensitivity on force development.
