= Aficamten =

Chemical compound

Clinical data
- Trade names: Myqorzo
- Other names: CK-3773274
- AHFS/Drugs.com: myqorzo
- License data: US DailyMed: Aficamten
- Routes of administration: By mouth
- Drug class: Cardiac myosin inhibitor
- ATC code: None

Legal status
- Legal status: US: ℞-only; EU: Rx-only

Identifiers
- IUPAC name: N-[(1R)-5-(5-Ethyl-1,2,4-oxadiazol-3-yl)-2,3-dihydro-1H-inden-1-yl]-1-methylpyrazole-4-carboxamide
- CAS Number: 2364554-48-1
- PubChem CID: 139331495
- DrugBank: DB18490
- ChemSpider: 114935503
- UNII: B1I77MH6K1
- KEGG: D12253
- ChEMBL: ChEMBL4847050
- PDB ligand: 6I6 (PDBe, RCSB PDB)

Chemical and physical data
- Formula: C_{18}H_{19}N_{5}O_{2}
- Molar mass: 337.383 g·mol^{−1}
- 3D model (JSmol): Interactive image
- SMILES: CCC1=NC(=NO1)C2=CC3=C(C=C2)[C@@H](CC3)NC(=O)C4=CN(N=C4)C
- InChI: InChI=1S/C18H19N5O2/c1-3-16-21-17(22-25-16)12-4-6-14-11(8-12)5-7-15(14)20-18(24)13-9-19-23(2)10-13/h4,6,8-10,15H,3,5,7H2,1-2H3,(H,20,24)/t15-/m1/s1; Key:IOVAZWDIRCRMTM-OAHLLOKOSA-N

Aficamten, sold under the brand name Myqorzo, is a medication used for the treatment of symptomatic obstructive hypertrophic cardiomyopathy. It is a cardiac myosin inhibitor developed by Cytokinetics.

Aficamten binds directly to the motor domain of cardiac myosin and prevents it from entering the force-producing state. This lowers cardiac contractility, leading to reduced left ventricular outflow tract obstruction in people with hypertrophic cardiomyopathy.

Aficamten was approved for medical use in the United States in December 2025, and in the European Union in February 2026.

== Medical uses ==
Aficamten is indicated for the treatment of adults with symptomatic obstructive hypertrophic cardiomyopathy to improve functional capacity and symptoms.

Symptomatic obstructive hypertrophic cardiomyopathy is an inherited condition where people have thickened heart muscle and reduced blood flow from the left side of the heart to the rest of the body, causing symptoms such as shortness of breath, fatigue, and potentially life-threatening cardiac events.

== Contraindiations ==
Use with rifampin is contraindicated.

== Adverse effects ==
The US prescription label for aficamten contains a boxed warning that it reduces left ventricular ejection fraction and can cause heart failure due to systolic dysfunction.

== History ==
The effectiveness and safety of aficamten were studied in 282 adults with symptomatic obstructive hypertrophic cardiomyopathy randomly assigned to receive aficamten or placebo for 24 weeks. At the end of the study, participants receiving aficamten had an increase in exercise capacity measured by peak oxygen uptake compared to no change in exercise capacity among those receiving placebo. Also, 59 percent of participants receiving aficamten experienced an improvement in physical activity limitations (measured using the New York Heart Association Classification system) compared to 24 percent of individuals receiving placebo.

== Society and culture ==
=== Legal status ===
Aficamten was approved for medical use in the United States in December 2025. The US Food and Drug Administration granted the application for aficamten orphan drug and breakthrough therapy designations.

In December 2025, the Committee for Medicinal Products for Human Use of the European Medicines Agency adopted a positive opinion, recommending the granting of a marketing authorization for the medicinal product Myqorzo, intended for the treatment of adults with obstructive hypertrophic cardiomyopathy. The applicant for this medicinal product is Cytokinetics (Ireland) Limited. Aficamten was authorized for medical use in the European Union in February 2026.

=== Names ===
Aficamten is the international nonproprietary name.

Aficamten is sold under the brand name Myqorzo.
