= Eugene Braunwald =

American cardiologist (1929–2026)

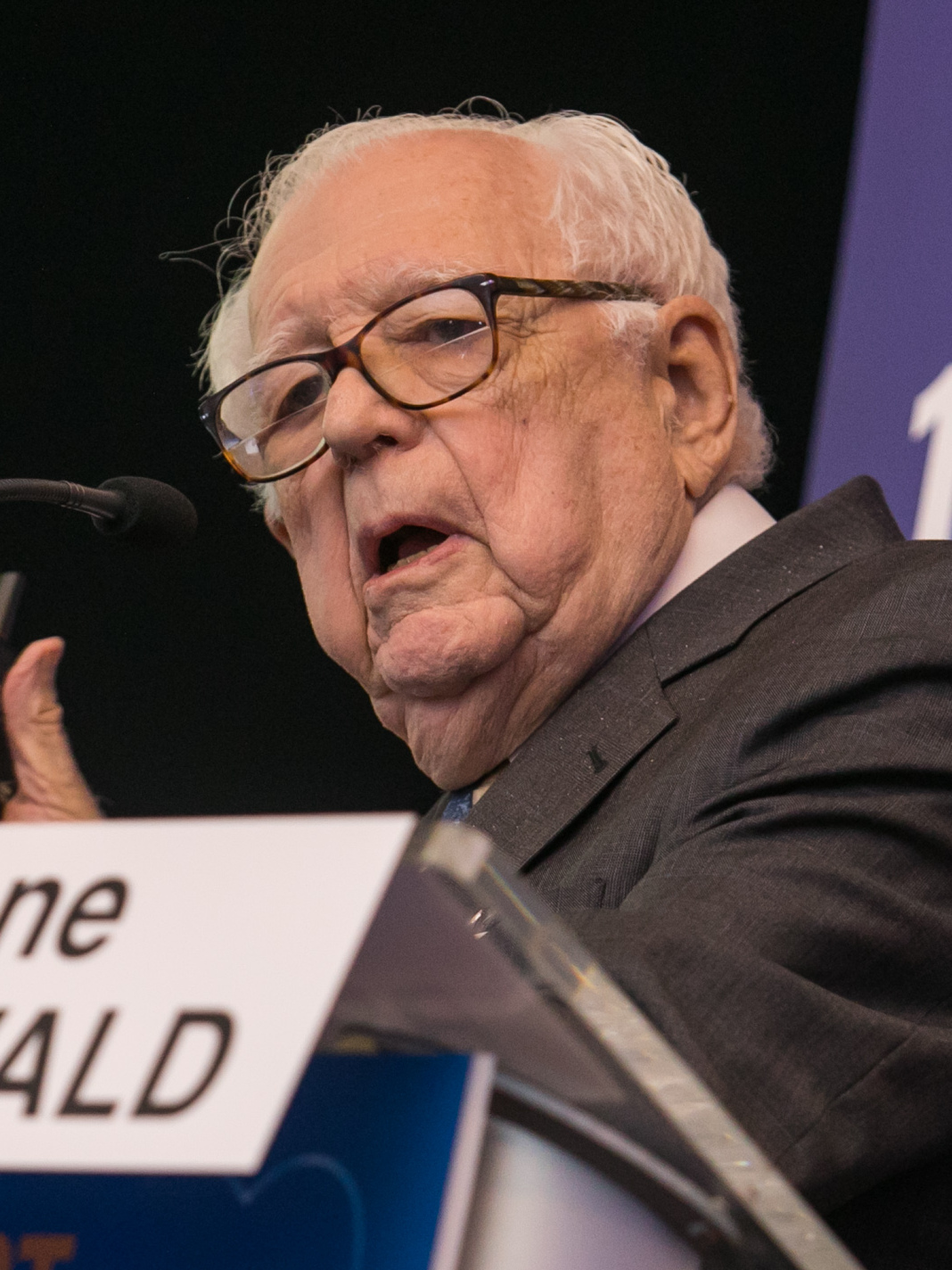
- Braunwald in 2017
- Born: August 15, 1929; Vienna, Austria
- Died: April 22, 2026 (aged 96); Newton, Massachusetts, U.S.
- Education: New York University
- Spouses: Nina Starr (m. 1952; died 1992); Elaine Smith (m. 1994)
- Children: 3
- Awards: American College of Cardiology Distinguished Scientist Award (1986)
- Scientific career
- Fields: Medical research; cardiology
- Workplaces: National Institutes of Health

Eugene Braunwald (August 15, 1929 – April 22, 2026) was an Austrian-born American cardiologist. He was a “groundbreaking cardiologist whose research helped transform heart disease from a near-certain killer into a condition often manageable with medications, procedures and careful monitoring”. His career was described as one of “contributions [that] were conceptual and practical.”

Eugene Braunwald was editor of the cardiology textbook Braunwald's Heart Disease, which is now in its 13th edition and was first published in 1980, a standard text for cardiologists. His long career included research reports in the last year of his life. He published extensively, 1,600 publications beginning with his first in 1954, and shared knowledge readily including as a teacher.

The American Heart Association has called him the father of cardiology. He responded by saying: "I was in the right place at the right time, with the right collaborators, the right mentors and mentees."

== Background ==
Braunwald was born to Jewish parents Wilhelm Braunwald and Clara Wallach in Vienna. He obtained his A.B. and M.D. at New York University, then completed his residency in internal medicine at Johns Hopkins School of Medicine.

He was inspired to pursue a career in cardiology after practicing in the Bellevue Cardiology Clinic, under Ludwig Eichna, during his time as a medical student at New York University. He also attended several cardiology courses in Mexico City, at the National Institute of Cardiology. He always thought that the Mexican School of Cardiology was above any other. "We have the technology, but they have the practice. The best book of cardiology is the patient itself", he always argued.

In 1952, Braunwald married Nina Starr, a thoracic surgeon and medical researcher, with whom he had three children, daughters Karen, Allison, and Jill. Nina Starr Braunwald died in 1992. In 1994, he married his second wife, Elaine Smith, formerly a senior hospital administrator. Braunwald died in Newton, Massachusetts on April 22, 2026, at the age of 96.

== Career ==
Braunwald served as chief of cardiology and clinical director at the National Heart, Lung and Blood Institute of the National Institutes of Health. During his tenure at the National Heart Institute, Braunwald's closest collaborator in the foundational work on cardiac muscle mechanics was Edmund Sonnenblick, with whom he and John Ross Jr. co-authored a landmark series of papers in the early 1960s that established the clinical framework of preload, afterload, and contractility.

He was then recruited to the University of California, San Diego, where from 1968 to 1972 he was the founding Chair of the Department of Medicine, bringing John Ross Jr. with him to be the founding Chief of Cardiology. He has since been at the Brigham and Women's Hospital, Harvard Medical School, where he served from 1972 to 1996 as Chair of the Department of Medicine.

Of the top 25 biomedical scientists whose work is cited most often by other scientists, nearly half have held appointments in this one department, most becoming members of the Department during Braunwald’s tenure as Chair. That means about 100 of the over 200 academic medical centers in the United States, alone, containing tens of thousands of scientists, are staffed by Braunwald’s students and colleagues.

Braunwald's contributions have been recognized by his election as a member of the U.S. National Academy of Sciences, the creation of a permanently endowed chair in his name by Harvard Medical School, and the establishment of the annual academic mentorship award by the American Heart Association.

== Death ==
Braunwald died at age 96 in April 2026, in a hospital in Newton, Massachusetts. At the time of his death, he lived in Weston, Massachusetts. He was survived by his second wife Elaine Smith, and the three daughters of his first marriage to Nina Starr Braunwald, and by grandchildren and great grandchildren.

== Awards ==
In 1966, he was awarded the Jacobi Medallion by the Mount Sinai Alumni (Mount Sinai Hospital) "for distinguished achievement in the field of medicine or extraordinary service to the Hospital, the School, or the Alumni."

In 1986, he received the Distinguished Scientist Award from American College of Cardiology.

In 2001, Braunwald received the Warren Alpert Foundation Prize.

In 2002, Braunwald received the King Faisal Prize for Medicine. He shared the prize with co-laureate Professor Finn Waagstein.

In 2004, he became the inaugural winner of the Libin/AHFMR Prize for Excellence in Cardiovascular Research.

In 2009, he was chairman of a policy group that severely limited outside pay for Harvard physicians.

In 2010, he received an honorary degree from the University of Rochester.

In 2013, he received a degree honoris causa from the University of Salerno, heir of the ancient Schola Medica Salernitana.

== Works ==
Braunwald has over 1000 publications in peer-reviewed journals. His work has dramatically expanded knowledge of heart disease in the area of congestive heart failure, coronary artery disease, and valvular heart disease. According to a biographer who studied the research publications of leading cardiologists, Braunwald has "had more publications in the top general medical and cardiology journals than any of the more than 42,000 authors" in PubMed, a database of medical authors, many of whom do not publish in either of those two narrower categories.

He was the editor of the cardiology textbook Braunwald's Heart Disease, which is now in its 13th edition. Braunwald was instrumental in running the TIMI (Thrombolysis in Myocardial Infarction) studies, which developed the concepts of thrombosis superimposed on atherosclerosis as the pathological bases for acute myocardial infarction, and has led to treatments that reduce damage to the heart from a heart attack. He was also an editor of Harrison's Principles of Internal Medicine, a textbook of internal medicine, for over 30 years.

== Controversy ==
John Darsee was a researcher in Braunwald's lab whom Braunwald considered the most remarkable of the 130 fellows who had worked in his lab. Braunwald offered Darsee a faculty position at Harvard in 1981. Some of Darsee's colleagues became concerned about the accuracy of Darsee's results. They went to the lab director, Robert Kloner, with their suspicions. Kloner investigated and found that Darsee had been altering dates on his laboratory work to make a few hours' work appear to be several weeks of data. When informed, Braunwald terminated Darsee's fellowship but did not inform the National Institutes of Health (NIH), which was funding the research, of Darsee's misconduct at the time.

Braunwald and Kloner conducted their own investigation into Darsee's work and found no other evidence of fraud; nor did a committee of Harvard faculty appointed by the Dean of the medical school. However, in October 1981 discrepancies between Darsee's data and those collected by other centers performing similar work triggered a formal investigation by the NIH. The NIH review found that Darsee had committed wide-ranging scientific misconduct, fabricating large amounts of data from experiments which he had never conducted. Harvard's investigation, as well as that of Braunwald and Kloner, was criticized for being inadequately rigorous and for reporting that they had "fully reviewed" data which later turned out to be non-existent. Darsee was barred by the NIH from receiving federal research funding for 10 years. Brigham and Women's Hospital, affiliated with Harvard, had to return $122,371 in research funds to NIH. This was the first time an institution was required to refund NIH due to research fraud.

Over time, more of Darsee's research came under fire. Investigations revealed that Darsee had previously used false data between 1966 and 1970, while an undergraduate at the University of Notre Dame. Following the NIH investigation, Harvard retracted 30 of Darsee's papers and abstracts in February 1983. Review of Darsee's earlier work at Emory University led to the retraction of an additional 52 papers and abstracts published during his tenure there. Braunwald drew criticism for lax supervision and for creating "a hurried pace and emphasis on productivity, coupled with limited interaction with senior scientists", which contributed to the ease with which Darsee was able to fabricate data. Arnold Relman, editor of The New England Journal of Medicine, also criticized Darsee's coauthors for their unfamiliarity with his work and lack of awareness of the scientific misconduct.
