= Reldesemtiv =

Chemical compound

Clinical data
- Other names: CK-2127107

Legal status
- Legal status: Investigational

Identifiers
- IUPAC name: 1-[2-[[3-fluoro-1-(3-fluoropyridin-2-yl)cyclobutyl]methylamino]pyrimidin-5-yl]pyrrole-3-carboxamide
- CAS Number: 1345410-31-2
- PubChem CID: 67454400
- IUPHAR/BPS: 11801
- DrugBank: DB15256
- ChemSpider: 75531291
- UNII: 4S0HBYW6QE
- KEGG: D11363
- ChEMBL: ChEMBL4297600

Chemical and physical data
- Formula: C_{19}H_{18}F_{2}N_{6}O
- Molar mass: 384.391 g·mol^{−1}
- 3D model (JSmol): Interactive image
- SMILES: C1C(CC1(CNC2=NC=C(C=N2)N3C=CC(=C3)C(=O)N)C4=C(C=CC=N4)F)F
- InChI: InChI=1S/C19H18F2N6O/c20-13-6-19(7-13,16-15(21)2-1-4-23-16)11-26-18-24-8-14(9-25-18)27-5-3-12(10-27)17(22)28/h1-5,8-10,13H,6-7,11H2,(H2,22,28)(H,24,25,26); Key:MQXWPWOCXGARRK-UHFFFAOYSA-N

Reldesemtiv is an investigational new drug that is being evaluated to treat amyotrophic lateral sclerosis. It is a troponin activator.
