= Association of Women Surgeons =

International advocacy group

The Association of Women Surgeons (AWS) is a non-profit educational and professional organization founded in 1981. Now with more than 4,000 members in more than 50 countries, AWS is one of the largest international organizations dedicated to supporting, enhancing the interaction, and facilitating the exchange of information between women surgeons at various stages in their careers, including students and trainees. The organization's mission statement reads: "To inspire, encourage, and enable women surgeons to achieve their personal and professional goals".

== History ==
The AWS was founded in 1981 when Dr. Patricia Numann posted a sign inviting any woman surgeon to a breakfast at the October meeting of the American College of Surgeons (ACS) in the San Francisco Hilton Hotel. The breakfast has continued for more than 40 years and grew into the Association of Women Surgeons (AWS). The AWS was incorporated in 1986 and continues to support women surgeons and ensure diversity in the house of surgery.

== Key collaborations and partnerships ==
- American College of Surgeons – In addition to having a Governor from the AWS to the ACS Board of Governors, the AWS has a liaison to the ACS Advisory Council on General Surgery, the ACS Women in Surgery Committee, and the ACS Resident and Associate Society Council. The reception prior to the annual AWS Foundation Awards Dinner is co-sponsored by the ACS Women in Surgery Committee.
- Association for Academic Surgery – A liaison position exists between the Council of both organizations; this member plans the biennial Women Surgeons luncheon during the Academic Surgical Congress.
- Association for Out Surgeons and Allies (AOSA) - A liaison position exists between the council of both organizations; this member organizes a travel award and a sponsored visiting professorship for an AOSA member who also belongs to the Association of Women Surgeons.
- International Surgical Society – During the biennial World Congress of Surgery, the AWS works with international women surgeons to develop educational panels and social events.
- Society of Black Academic Surgeons (SBAS) - A liaison position exists between the council of both organizations; this member organizes a sponsored travel award and a visiting professorship for an SBAS member who also belongs to the Association of Women Surgeons.
- Society of Asian Academic Surgeons (SAAS) - A liaison position exists between the council of both organizations; this member organizes sponsored travel awards and visiting professorship for an SAAS member who also belongs to the Association of Women Surgeons.
- Latino Surgical Society (LSS) - A liaison position exists between the council of both organizations; this member organizes a sponsored visiting professorship for an LSS member who also belongs to the Association of Women Surgeons.
- WiSA (Women in Surgery Africa) – AWS leaders, particularly Drs. Patricia Numann and Hilary Sanfey, provided guidance for the launch of WiSA in 2015 and have provided mentorship for leaders of WiSA.

== Past presidents ==
- 1981 – 1988 – Patricia Numann
- 1988 – 1990 – Tamar Earnest
- 1990 – 1992 – Mary McCarthy
- 1992 – 1994 – Linda Phillips
- 1994 – 1995 – Margaret Dunn
- 1995 – 1996 – Joyce Majure
- 1996 – 1997 – M. Margaret Kemeny
- 1997 – 1998 – Leigh Neumayer
- 1998 – 1999 – Beth Sutton
- 1999 – 2000 – Dixie Mills
- 2000 – 2001 – Kim Ephgrave
- 2001 – 2002 – Myriam Curet
- 2002 – 2003 – Susan Kaiser
- 2003 – 2004 – Vivian Gahtan
- 2004 – 2005 – Susan Stuart
- 2005 – 2006 – Hilary Sanfey
- 2006 – 2007 – Patricia Bergen
- 2007 – 2008 – Mary Hooks
- 2008 – 2009 – AJ Copeland
- 2009 – 2010 – Rosemary Kozar
- 2010 – 2011 – Marilyn Marx
- 2011 – 2012 – Betsy Tuttle-Newhall
- 2012 – 2013 – Susan Pories
- 2013 – 2014 – Danielle Walsh
- 2014 – 2015 – Nancy Gantt
- 2015 – 2016 – Amalia Cochran
- 2016 – 2017 – Christine Laronga
- 2017 – 2018 – Celeste Hollands
- 2018 – 2019 – Sareh Parengi
- 2019 - 2020 – Sharon Stein
- 2020 - 2021 – Marie Crandall
- 2021 - 2022 – Elizabeth Shaughnessy
- 2022 - 2023 – Marybeth Hughes
- 2023 - 2024 – Kandace McGuire
- 2024 - 2025 – Salewa Oseni

== Sponsored awards ==
- AWS Fellowship Research Grant – $27,500 unrestricted research grant awarded annually to an AWS member.
- Kim Ephgrave Visiting Professor Award – provides academic institutions the opportunity to host leading women surgeons as speakers using funding from the AWS Foundation.
- Nina Starr Braunwald Award (1993—present) recognizes a member or nonmember surgeon in recognition of sustained outstanding contributions to the advancement of women in surgery.
- Olga Jonasson Distinguished Member Award (1990–present) is given annually to an AWS member who through outstanding mentorship enables and encourages women surgeons to realize their personal and professional goals.
- Past Presidents' Honorary Member Award (1990–present) is awarded annually to non-members who are supportive of AWS goals and mission. Of note, many of the recipients of this award have been male surgeons.
- Hilary Sanfey Outstanding Woman Resident Award (1999–present) recognizes outstanding women surgical trainees who demonstrate potential as future leaders in surgery.
- Patricia Numann Medical Student Award (2003–present) was established to encourage and support female medical students pursuing a career in surgery.
- Women Surgeons in Low & Middle Income Countries (2016–present) was established to enable a woman surgeon in a low or middle income country to attend a surgical meeting or to participate in a workshop or other career development/ educational opportunity.
- The Dr. Sally Abston AWS Distinguished Member Award is awarded to AWS member who is nationally recognized for clinical expertise and for providing outstanding mentorship.
- The Dr. Charles W. Putnam Distinguished Mentor Award is given to an AWS member or non-member who has a sustained record of mentoring women surgeons and is a true agent of change to create an environment in which women surgeons can achieve their personal and professional goals.
