= Endocrine surgery =

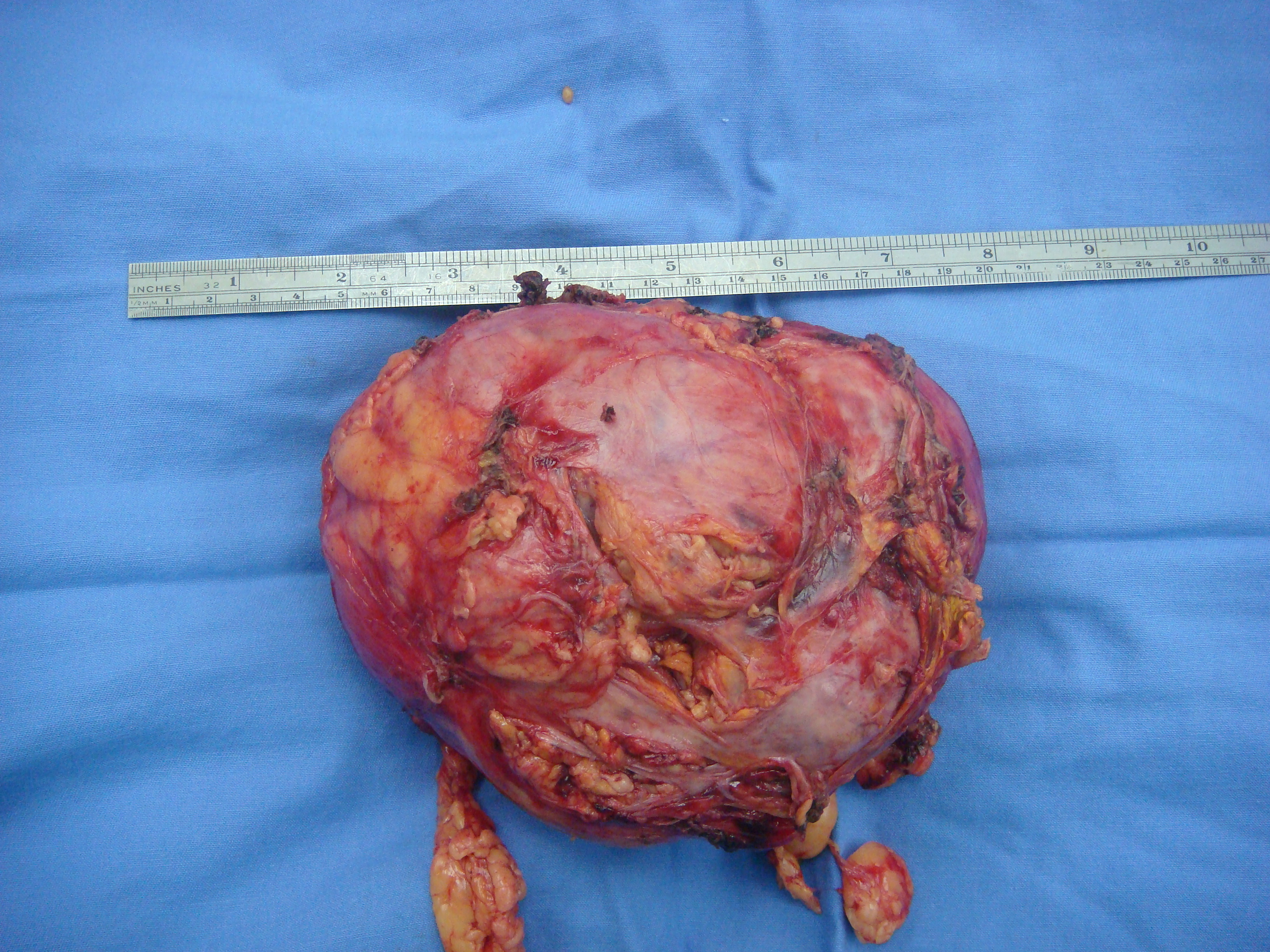
- Adrenalectomy
- ICD-10-PCS: 0G
- ICD-9-CM: 06-07
- MeSH: D013507
- OPS-301 code: 5-06...5-07

Endocrine surgery is a surgical sub-speciality focusing on surgery of the endocrine glands, including the thyroid gland, the parathyroid glands, the adrenal glands, glands of the endocrine pancreas, and some neuroendocrine glands.

== Types ==
=== Thyroid surgery ===
Surgery of the thyroid gland constitutes the bulk of endocrine surgical procedures worldwide. This may be done for a variety of conditions, help ranging from benign multinodular goiter to thyroid cancer. In the United Kingdom it was developed as a separate specialty from general surgery by Richard Welbourne and John Lynn, surgeons at what was then the 'Royal Postgraduate Medical School' and is now the Hammersmith Hospital and contains the Department of Thyroid and Endocrine Surgery staffed by consultant surgeons Professor Fausto Palazzo, Professor Neil Tolley and Miss Aimee Di Marco. Operations involve removal of the thyroid gland (thyroidectomy) either as a part of the gland (lobectomy or hemithyroidectomy), or the whole gland (total thyroidectomy). Incomplete resections (sub-total or near total thyroidectomy) are also infrequently performed, but are disfavored by most surgeons.

=== Parathyroid surgery ===
Removal of the parathyroid gland(s) is referred to as parathyroidectomy and is most commonly performed for primary hyperparathyroidism. Parathyroidectomy is also performed to treat tertiary hyperparathyroidism arising from chronic kidney failure.

=== Adrenal surgery ===
Adrenalectomy, the surgical removal of the adrenal gland, is performed to treat conditions including Conn syndrome, pheochromocytoma, and adreno-cortical cancer.

=== Pancreatic surgery ===
Diseases of the endocrine pancreas occur very infrequently; these include insulinomas, gastrinomas etc. Surgery for these conditions range from simple tumor enucleation to more larger resections.

== Development ==
Endocrine surgery is generally well developed. Endocrine surgery has developed as a sub-specialty surgical category because of the technical nature of these operations and the associated risks of operating in the neck. In Surgery: Basic Science and Clinical Evidence, the book the efficacy prior research:

Surgeons and physicians have advanced endocrine surgery by careful description of unusual patients and families with endocrine syndromes...Surgeons have also improved techniques for preparation for surgery and methods...

— Norton, Barie, Bollinger, et al.

In the 1970s, a specialty training program at Hammersmith Hospital was the primary location for early work in training a large number of surgeons. It is well established that complications are much less common if performed by surgeons who do at least 100 thyroid operations per year. In the United Kingdom most thyroid surgery is performed by surgeons doing less than 20 thyroid operations per year. Permanent damage to both voice box nerves is an extreme rarity and needs in most cases a permanent tracheostomy. Data on the outcomes of all surgeons performing endocrine surgery in the UK is publicly available via the 'British Association of Endocrine and Thyroid Surgeons' website.

== Technique ==
=== Thyroid surgery ===
Some surgical teams leave wound drains in place after surgery to the thyroid gland. There is no strong evidence that wound drains improve outcomes following surgery and there is low-quality evidence that wound drains increase the length of time a person stays in the hospital following thyroid surgery.
