= Nina Starr Braunwald =

American thoracic surgeon and medical researcher (1928-1992)

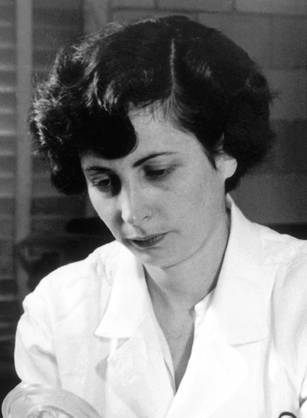
- Born: Nina Helen Starr; March 2, 1928; Brooklyn, New York, U.S.
- Died: August 5, 1992 (aged 64); Weston, Massachusetts, U.S.
- Education: New York University; Bellevue Hospital
- Occupations: Thoracic surgeon and medical researcher
- Known for: Artificial heart valves
- Spouse: Eugene Braunwald (m. 1952)
- Children: 3
- Scientific career
- Fields: Thoracic surgeon
- Workplaces: Georgetown University Hospital; University of California, San Diego; National Heart Institute

Nina Starr Braunwald (March 2, 1928 – August 5, 1992) was an American thoracic surgeon and medical researcher who was among the first women to perform open-heart surgery. She was also the first woman to be certified by the American Board of Thoracic Surgery, and the first to be elected to the American Association for Thoracic Surgery. In 1960, at the age of 32, she led the operative team at the U.S. National Institutes of Health (NIH) that implanted the first successful artificial mitral human heart valve replacement, which she had designed and fabricated.

== Early life and education ==
Nina Helen Starr was born to Morris K. and Mary Starr on March 2, 1928 in Brooklyn, New York. Her mother was engaged in interior design, and her father was a physician.

She showed early scientific promise when at age 14 she became a member of the American Society of Amateur Microscopers. She received her baccalaureate and medical degrees from New York University, and from 1952 to 1955 she trained in general surgery at New York's Bellevue Hospital, one of the first women to do so.

== Career ==
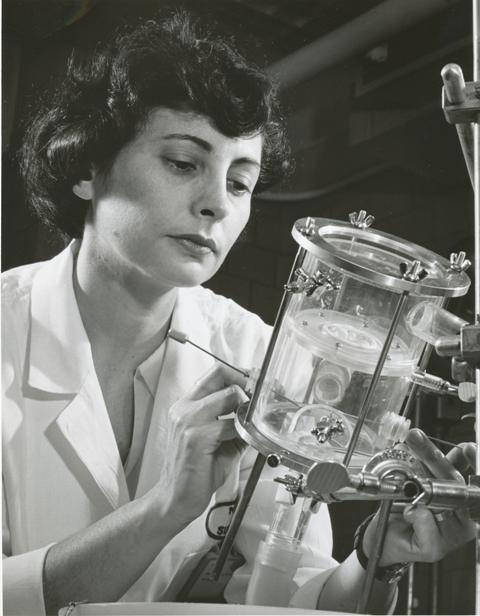
Starr Braunwald adjusting a test chamber holding an artificial heart valve.

Braunwald completed her training in general surgery at Georgetown University Hospital in Washington, D.C., with a postdoctoral fellowship in the surgical laboratory of Charles A. Hufnagel, inventor of the first artificial heart valve. She joined the NIH National Heart Institute (now the National Heart, Lung, and Blood Institute) in nearby Bethesda, Maryland in 1958 under the mentorship of Andrew G. Morrow. She was a Staff Surgeon at the National Heart Institute until 1965, and then was named Deputy Chief of the Clinic of Surgery, a position she held until 1968.

Braunwald designed and fabricated an experimental, artificial mitral valve prostheses, implanting them in dogs at the National Heart Institute's surgical clinic in 1959. On March 11, 1960, she performed the first successful human implant, in a 44-year-old woman with mitral regurgitation.

She then developed a cloth-covered mechanical valve (the Braunwald-Cutter valve), which was implanted into thousands of patients during the late 1960s and early 1970s. Her other significant contributions include the development of the stented aortic homograft (a graft of same-species tissue, in this case, human tissue) for mitral valve replacement, surgical treatment of chronic thromboembolic disease, and pioneering techniques for the use of tissue cultures to discourage the formation of clots when prosthetic valves and circulatory assist devices are in use. In the 1960s, articles in Life and Time magazines described her as one of America's young "movers and shakers." In 1962, she received the Golden Plate Award of the American Academy of Achievement.

Braunwald moved to the University of California, San Diego along with her husband, who was appointed Chief of Medicine while she was appointed Associate Professor of Surgery. While at UC San Diego, Braunwald established a Cardiothoracic surgery training program. She followed her husband once again, in 1972, to the Boston area, where she became an Associate Professor of Surgery at Harvard Medical School. While at Harvard, she was a Staff Surgeon in the Division of Cardiac and Thoracic Surgery at Brigham and Women’s Hospital, a Staff Surgeon in the Division of Cardiac Surgery at Boston Children's Hospital, and a Consultant in the Division of Cardiac Surgery at the West Roxbury Veterans Administration Medical Center.

Braunwald published more than 110 peer-reviewed articles in leading journals such as Circulation, The New England Journal of Medicine, and the Journal of Thoracic and Cardiovascular Surgery. Her work also received media attention, as well as having an impact on cardiac surgery.

Following her death, the Thoracic Surgery Foundation for Research and Education established the Nina Starr Braunwald Research Grant, to recognize her commitment to the early academic development of women in cardiac surgery. The award includes two years of research funding support and is given annually to a promising young woman academic cardiac surgeon. This foundation also offers the Nina Starr Braunwald Research Fellowship to provide salary and direct experimental support for women cardiac surgical trainees who wish to learn investigational skills. Similarly, the Association of Women Surgeons provides an annual Nina Starr Braunwald Award to a surgical leader who has demonstrated exceptional support of a role for women in academic surgery.

== Personal life and death ==
In 1952, she married Eugene Braunwald, her classmate in college and medical school and also a cardiovascular researcher, with whom she had three daughters.

Nina Starr Braunwald died of cancer on August 5, 1992, aged 64, in Weston, Massachusetts, after a career that included prominent appointments at the NIH, University of California, San Diego, Harvard Medical School, and Brigham and Women's Hospital.
