= Hypertrophic cardiomyopathy =

Enlargement of the heart muscle

- Other names: Asymmetric septal hypertrophy; idiopathic hypertrophic subaortic stenosis; hypertrophic obstructive cardiomyopathy (HOCM)
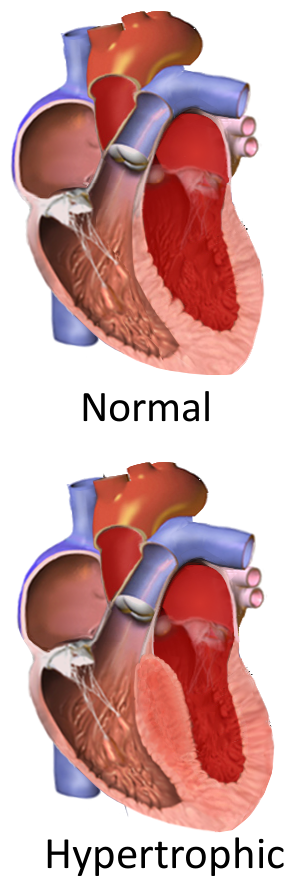
- Specialty: Cardiology
- Symptoms: Feeling tired, leg swelling, shortness of breath, chest pain, fainting
- Complications: Heart failure, irregular heartbeat, sudden cardiac death
- Causes: Genetics, Fabry disease, Friedreich's ataxia, amyloidosis, certain medications
- Diagnostic method: Electrocardiogram, echocardiogram, stress testing, genetic testing
- Differential diagnosis: Hypertensive heart disease, aortic stenosis, athlete's heart
- Treatment: Medications, implantable cardiac defibrillator, surgery
- Medication: Beta blockers, verapamil, disopyramide
- Prognosis: Less than 1% per year risk of death (with treatment)
- Frequency: in average 1 in 500 people

Hypertrophic cardiomyopathy (HCM, or HOCM when obstructive) is a condition in which muscle tissues of the heart become thickened without an obvious cause. The parts of the heart most commonly affected are the interventricular septum and the ventricles. This results in the heart being less able to pump blood effectively and also may cause electrical conduction problems. Specifically affected are the bundle branches that conduct impulses through the interventricular septum and into the Purkinje fibers, as these are responsible for the depolarization of contractile cells of both ventricles.

People who have hypertrophic cardiomyopathy may have a range of symptoms. People may be asymptomatic, or may have fatigue, leg swelling, and shortness of breath. It may also result in chest pain or fainting. Being dehydrated may aggravate the symptoms. Complications may include heart failure, an irregular heartbeat, and sudden cardiac death.

Hypertrophic cardiomyopathy is most commonly inherited in an autosomal dominant pattern. It is often due to mutations in certain genes involved with making heart muscle proteins. Other inherited causes of left ventricular hypertrophy include Fabry disease and Friedreich's ataxia. Other considerations for causes of an enlarged heart are athlete's heart and hypertension (high blood pressure). Making the diagnosis of hypertrophic cardiomyopathy often involves a family history or pedigree, an electrocardiogram, echocardiogram, and stress testing. Genetic testing is recommended for affected people and their family members. Hypertrophic cardiomyopathy can be distinguished from other inherited causes of cardiomyopathy by its autosomal dominant pattern, whereas Fabry disease is X-linked, and Friedreich's ataxia is inherited in an autosomal recessive pattern.

Treatment depends on symptoms and other risk factors. Medications may include beta blockers, verapamil, disopyramide, mavacamten or aficamten. An implantable cardiac defibrillator may be recommended in those with certain types of irregular heartbeat. Surgery, in the form of a septal myectomy or heart transplant, may be done in those who do not improve with other measures. With treatment, the risk of death from the disease is less than one percent per year.

Hypertrophic cardiomyopathy affects up to one in 500 people. People of all ages may be affected. The first modern description of the disease was by Donald Teare in 1958.

== Signs and symptoms ==
Many people with hypertrophic cardiomyopathy are asymptomatic or mildly symptomatic, and many of those carrying disease genes for hypertrophic cardiomyopathy do not have clinically detectable disease. The symptoms of hypertrophic cardiomyopathy include shortness of breath due to stiffening and decreased blood filling of the ventricles, exertional chest pain (also known as angina) due to reduced blood flow to the coronary arteries, uncomfortable awareness of the heart beat (palpitations), lightheadedness, weakness, fainting, and sudden cardiac death.

Shortness of breath is largely due to increased thickness of the left ventricle (LV) wall and interventricular septal wall, which impairs the filling of the ventricles, but also leads to elevated pressure in the left ventricle and left atrium as a result of increased thickness. This impaired heart filling can cause blood to back up in the lungs' circulation, causing further symptoms. Often, symptoms of hypertrophic cardiomyopathy are due to congestive heart failure (especially activity intolerance and dyspnea), but also lower extremity edema.

Major risk factors for sudden death in individuals with hypertrophic cardiomyopathy include prior history of cardiac arrest or ventricular fibrillation, spontaneous sustained ventricular tachycardia, abnormal exercise blood pressure and non-sustained ventricular tachycardia, unexplained syncope, family history of premature sudden death, and left ventricular wall thickness greater than 15 mm to 30 mm, on echocardiogram.

Hypertrophic cardiomyopathy also presents with a systolic ejection murmur that increases in intensity with decreased preload (as in the Valsalva maneuver or standing), or with decreased afterload (as in vasodilator administration). On the other hand, the murmur decreases in intensity with increased preload (as in squatting) or increased afterload (as in the handgrip maneuver). "Spike and dome" pulse and "triple ripple apical impulse" are two other signs that can be discovered in physical examination. Pulsus bisferiens may also be found during examination.

== Genetics ==
Genetic basis
Gene	Locus	Type
MYH7	14q12	CMH1 ( 192600)
TNNT2	1q32	CMH2 ( 115195)
TPM1	15q22.1	CMH3 ( 115196)
MYBPC3	11p11.2	CMH4 ( 115197)
?	?	CMH5
PRKAG2	7q36	CMH6 ( 600858)
TNNI3	19q13.4	CMH7 ( 613690)
MYL3	3p	CMH8 ( 608751)
TTN	2q24.3	CMH9 ( 613765)
MYL2	12q23-q24	CMH10 ( 608758)
ACTC1	15q14	CMH11 ( 612098)
CSRP3	11p15.1	CMH12 ( 612124)

Familial hypertrophic cardiomyopathy is inherited as an autosomal dominant trait which is attributed to mutations in one of several genes that encode for the sarcomere proteins, and most diagnosed individuals will have an affected parent. Occasionally, both copies of the gene will be defective, a condition that may lead to a more severe manifestation of the disease.

Currently, about 40–60% of people with hypertrophic cardiomyopathy will have a mutation identified in at least one of nine sarcomeric genes. Approximately 40% of these mutations occur in the β-myosin heavy chain gene on chromosome 14 q11.2-3, and approximately 40% involve the cardiac myosin-binding protein C gene. Since hypertrophic cardiomyopathy is typically an autosomal dominant trait, children of a single hypertrophic cardiomyopathy parent have a 50% chance of inheriting the disease-causing mutation. Whenever such a mutation is identified, family-specific genetic testing can be used to identify relatives at risk for the disease, although clinical severity and age of onset cannot be predicted.

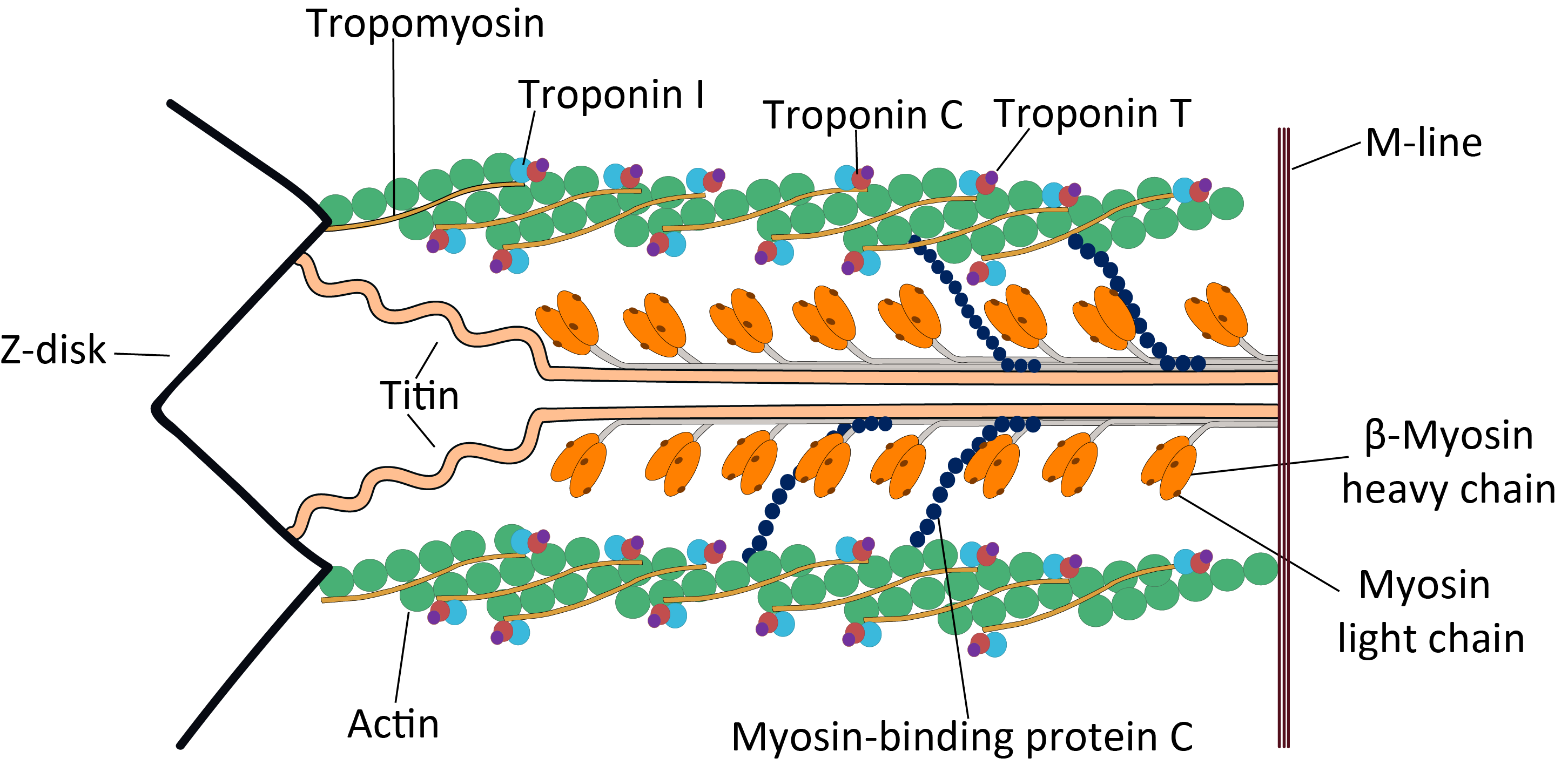
Cardiac sarcomere structure, featuring various components, including myosin-binding protein C

An insertion/deletion polymorphism in the gene encoding for angiotensin converting enzyme (ACE) alters the clinical phenotype of the disease. The D/D (deletion/deletion) genotype of ACE is associated with more marked hypertrophy of the left ventricle and may be associated with a higher risk of adverse outcomes.

Over 1400 mutations have been identified in genes known to lead to hypertrophic cardiomyopathy. Some mutations could have more harmful potential compared to others (β-myosin heavy chain). For example, troponin T mutations were originally associated with a 50% mortality before the age of 40. However, a more recent and larger study found a similar risk to other sarcomeric protein mutations. The age at disease onset of hypertrophic cardiomyopathy with MYH7 mutations is earlier and leads to more severe symptoms. Moreover, mutations on troponin C can alter Ca^{+2} sensibility on force development in cardiac muscle, these mutations are named after the amino acid that was changed after the location in which it happened, such as A8V, A31S, C84Y and D145E.

== Pathophysiology ==
Ventricular hypertrophy causes a dynamic pressure gradient across the left ventricular outflow tract (LVOT), which is associated with further narrowing of the outflow during systole. An initial hypothesis was that the mitral valve leaflets were pulled towards the septum contributing to the outflow obstruction. The pulling was thought to occur by several proposed mechanisms, including the flow of blood through the narrowed outflow tract resulting in a higher velocity, and less pressure via the Venturi effect. This low pressure then causes the anterior leaflet of the mitral valve to be pulled into the outflow tract, resulting in further obstruction. Subsequent research has shown that the pushing force of flow, known as flow drag, is the dominant force that causes systolic anterior motion and obstruction. Because of the LV septal bulge, and concomitant abnormalities of the mitral valve and its papillary muscles, LV ejection flow strikes the mitral valve from behind and pushes it into the septum. These observations led to the extended surgical septal myectomy in which the resection is extended to the level of the papillary muscles, and to procedures to repair the mitral valve when it protrudes into the LV ejection flow.

The hypertrophied (thickened) left ventricular wall in hypertrophic cardiomyopathy requires a greater oxygen demand. This increased oxygen demand of the enlarged heart muscle, combined with fibrosis (scarring) of the heart muscle and a reduced flow through thick-walled coronary arteries results in an oxygen deficit to the heart muscle. These pathophysiological changes result in the anginal (exertional chest pain) symptoms sometimes seen in hypertrophic cardiomyopathy.

== Diagnosis ==
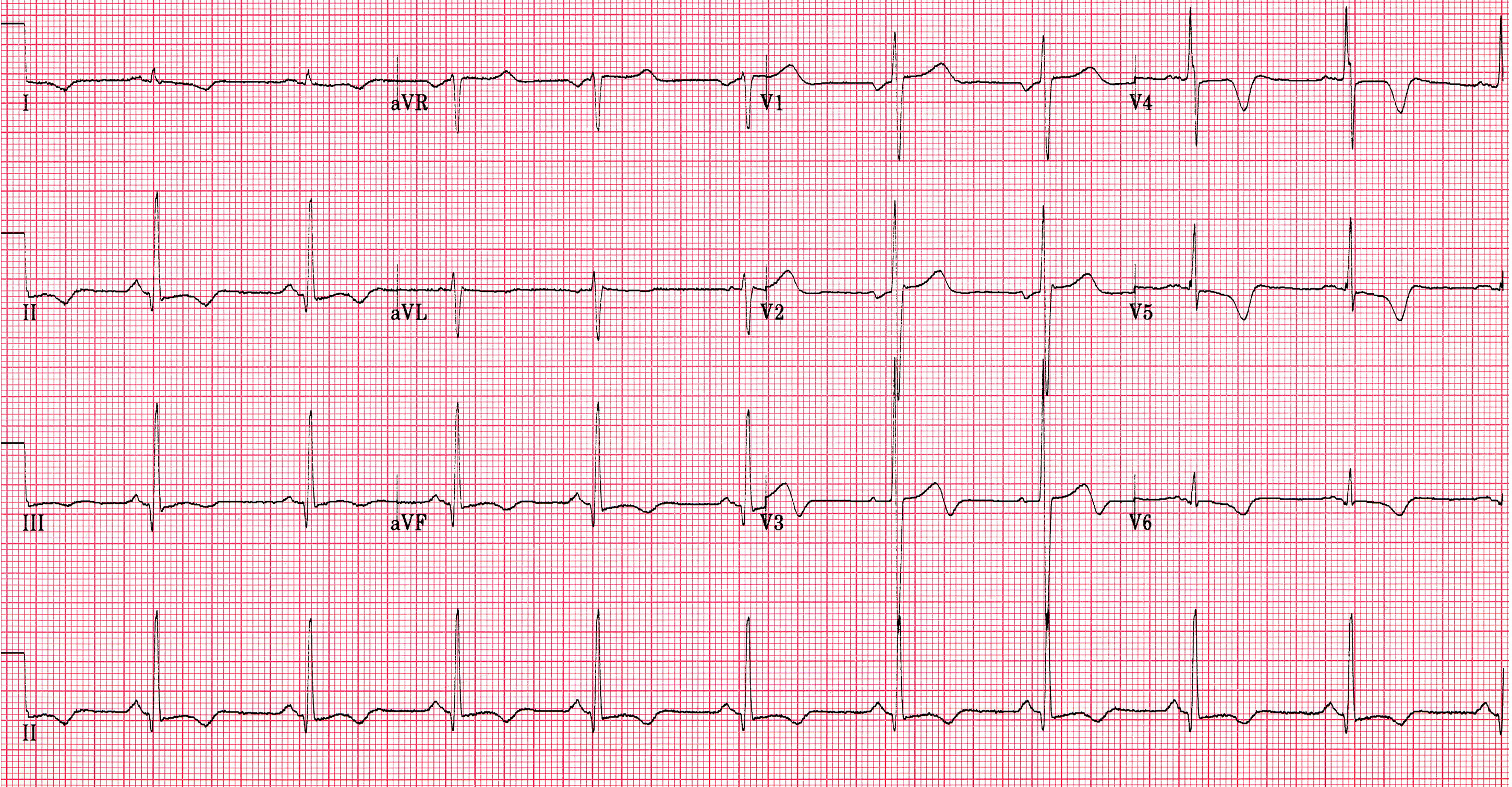
An ECG showing HOCM

A diagnosis of hypertrophic cardiomyopathy is based upon several features of the disease process. While there is use of echocardiography, cardiac catheterization, or cardiac MRI in the diagnosis of the disease, other important considerations include ECG and genetic testing. Genetic testing is recommended for those affected by hypertrophic cardiomyopathy and their family members. In about 60 to 70% of the cases, cardiac MRI shows thickening of more than 15 mm of the lower part of the ventricular septum. T1-weighted imaging may identify scarring of cardiac tissues while T2-weighted imaging may identify edema and inflammation of cardiac tissue which is associated with acute clinical signs of chest pain and fainting episodes.

ECG is the most sensitive diagnostic test.

Differentiating obstructive from non-obstructive HCM is important for choosing effective therapy. A confusing aspect of HCM is that obstruction may be latent at rest, and only revealed by provocations. Exercise echocardiography, performing an echocardiogram after treadmill or bicycle exercise, may reveal obstruction when it is not present at rest or after the Valsalva maneuver. Even a more potent provocation of latent obstruction is the postprandial exercise echocardiogram (PPXSE) that is the strongest physiologic provocation of obstruction. The PPXSE reproduces the situation that many patients with obstruction experience, that of enhanced symptoms with even mild exertion after eating. When a patient cannot exercise, resting echocardiography performed 30–60 minutes after eating may similarly demonstrate obstruction, not shown at rest. With postprandial provocation, patients who previously were diagnosed as non-obstructive now are diagnosed as obstructed and thus may be candidates for treatments geared to obstruction.

=== Variants ===
Depending on whether the distortion of normal heart anatomy causes an obstruction of the outflow of blood from the left ventricle of the heart, hypertrophic cardiomyopathy can be classified as obstructive or non-obstructive. The obstructive variant of hypertrophic cardiomyopathy is hypertrophic obstructive cardiomyopathy (HOCM). The diagnosis of left ventricular outflow tract obstruction is usually made by echocardiographic assessment and is defined as a peak left ventricular outflow tract gradient of ≥ 30 mmHg.

Another, non-obstructive variant of hypertrophic cardiomyopathy is apical hypertrophic cardiomyopathy (AHCM or ApHCM), also called Yamaguchi syndrome. It was first described in individuals of Japanese descent. Sakamoto was the first to report the condition's ECG pattern in 1976. Yamaguchi was the first to characterize the syndrome and its ventriculargrophic feature in 1979. Yamaguchi syndrome is an infrequent variant of hypertrophic cardiomyopathy in the European population. ApHCM is thought to be autosomal dominant, with the majority of mutations occurring in the genes encoding for the sarcomere. ECG findings in Yamaguchi syndrome may mimic those of a heart attack. Yamaguchi syndrome has a more favorable prognosis than classic hypertrophic cardiomyopathy, and it is more common in Asian populations.

=== Cardiac catheterization ===
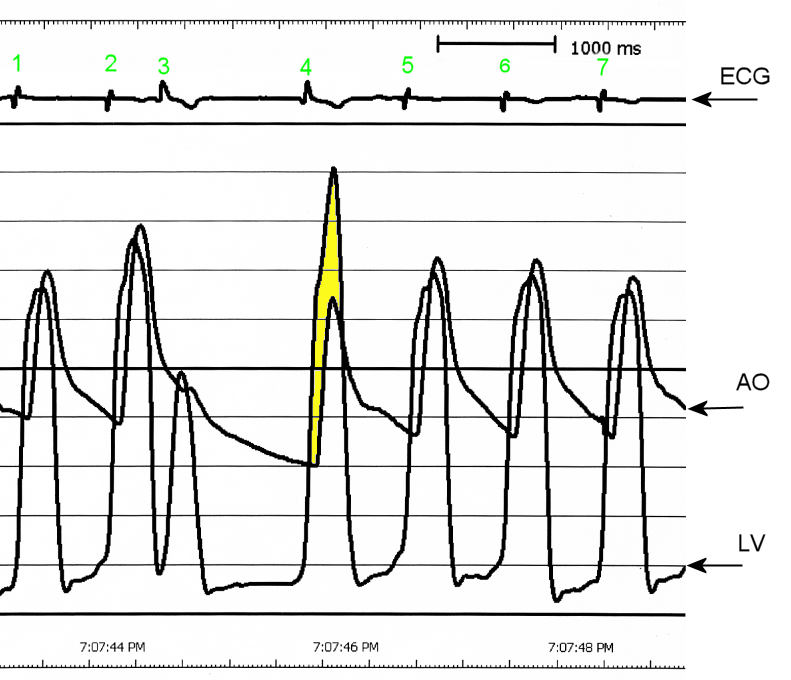
Pressure tracings demonstrating the Brockenbrough–Braunwald–Morrow sign AO = Descending aorta; LV = Left ventricle; ECG = Electrocardiogram. After the third QRS complex, the ventricle has more time to fill. Since there is more time to fill, the left ventricle will have more volume at the end of diastole (increased preload). Due to the Frank–Starling law of the heart, the contraction of the left ventricle (and pressure generated by the left ventricle) will be greater on the subsequent beat (beat #4 in this picture). Because of the dynamic nature of the outflow obstruction in hypertrophic cardiomyopathy, the obstruction increases more than the left ventricular pressure increase. This causes a fall in the aortic pressure as the left ventricular pressure rises (seen as the yellow shaded area in the picture).

Upon cardiac catheterization, catheters can be placed in the left ventricle and the ascending aorta, to measure the pressure difference between these structures. In normal individuals, during ventricular systole, the pressure in the ascending aorta and the left ventricle will equalize, and the aortic valve is open. In individuals with aortic stenosis or with hypertrophic cardiomyopathy with an outflow tract gradient, there will be a pressure gradient (difference) between the left ventricle and the aorta, with the left ventricular pressure higher than the aortic pressure. This gradient represents the degree of obstruction that has to be overcome to eject blood from the left ventricle.

The Brockenbrough–Braunwald–Morrow sign is observed in individuals with hypertrophic cardiomyopathy with an outflow tract gradient. This sign can be used to differentiate hypertrophic cardiomyopathy from aortic stenosis. In individuals with aortic stenosis, after a premature ventricular contraction (PVC), the following ventricular contraction will be more forceful, and the pressure generated in the left ventricle will be higher. Because of the fixed obstruction that the stenotic aortic valve represents, the post-PVC ascending aortic pressure will increase as well. In individuals with hypertrophic cardiomyopathy, however, the degree of obstruction will increase more than the force of contraction will increase in the post-PVC beat. The result of this is that the left ventricular pressure increases and the ascending aortic pressure decreases, with an increase in the LVOT gradient. Those with a dynamic obstruction across the aortic valve (those with HOCM) will also have a decrease in the pulse pressure in the beat after a PVC.

== Screening ==
Although hypertrophic cardiomyopathy may be asymptomatic, affected individuals may present with symptoms ranging from mild to critical heart failure and sudden cardiac death at any point from early childhood to seniority. Hypertrophic cardiomyopathy is the leading cause of sudden cardiac death in young athletes in the United States, and the most common genetic cardiovascular disorder. One study found that the incidence of sudden cardiac death in young competitive athletes declined in the Veneto region of Italy by 89% from an unusually high baseline rate since the 1982 introduction of routine cardiac screening for athletes. As of 2010, however, studies have shown that the incidence of sudden cardiac death, among all people with hypertrophic cardiomyopathy, has declined to one percent or less. Screen-positive individuals who are diagnosed with cardiac disease are usually told to avoid competitive athletics.

Hypertrophic cardiomyopathy can be detected with an echocardiogram (ECHO) with 80%+ accuracy, which can be preceded by screening with an electrocardiogram (ECG) to test for heart abnormalities. Cardiac magnetic resonance imaging (CMR), considered the gold standard for determining the physical properties of the left ventricular wall, can serve as an alternative screening tool when an echocardiogram provides inconclusive results. For example, the identification of segmental lateral ventricular hypertrophy cannot be accomplished with echocardiography alone. Also, left ventricular hypertrophy may be absent in children under thirteen years of age. This reduces sensitivity of pre-adolescents' echocardiograms.

=== United States ===
The American Academy of Pediatrics recommends screening questions for all children (both athletes and non-athletes) to assess the risk of congenital heart disease, inherited cardiac disorders (including hypertrophic cardiomyopathy) and sudden cardiac arrest or death. The questions assess symptoms such as syncope (passing out) or seizures in the child, exercise related chest pain or shortness of breath, having a family member with sudden cardiac death before age 50, having a family history of hypertrophic cardiomyopathy, HOCM, or a family member requiring a pacemaker or implantable cardiac defibrillator before the age of 50. The role of universal EKG or non-invasive cardiac imaging in amateur or recreational athletes is not well established.

There are several potential challenges associated with routine screening for hypertrophic cardiomyopathy in the United States. First, the U.S. athlete population of 15 million is large compared to other countries. Second, these events are rare, with fewer than 100 deaths in the U.S. due to hypertrophic cardiomyopathy in competitive athletes per year, or about 1 death per 220,000 athletes. Lastly, genetic testing may suggest a diagnosis of hypertrophic cardiomyopathy; however, due to the numerous HCM-causing mutations, this method of screening is complex and is not cost-effective.

=== Canada ===
Canadian genetic testing guidelines and recommendations for individuals diagnosed with hypertrophic cardiomyopathy are as follows:

- The main purpose of genetic testing is to screen family members.
  - According to the results, at-risk relatives may be encouraged to undergo extensive testing.
- Genetic testing is not meant to confirm a diagnosis.
- Genetic testing is not intended for risk assessment or treatment decisions.
  - Evidence only supports clinical testing in predicting the progression and risk of developing complications of hypertrophic cardiomyopathy.

== Treatment ==
=== Asymptomatic people ===
A significant number of people with hypertrophic cardiomyopathy do not have any symptoms and will have a normal life expectancy, although they should avoid particularly strenuous activities or competitive athletics. Asymptomatic people should be screened for risk factors for sudden cardiac death. In people with resting or inducible outflow obstructions, situations that will cause dehydration or vasodilation (such as the use of vasodilatory or diuretic blood pressure medications) should be avoided. Septal reduction therapy is not recommended in asymptomatic people.

=== Medications ===
The primary goal of medications in the treatment of hypertrophic cardiomyopathy is to relieve symptoms such as chest pain, shortness of breath, and palpitations. Beta blockers are considered first-line agents, as they can reduce the outflow obstruction, reduce heart strain and relieve anginal symptoms. Beta-blockers can also slow the heart rate and decrease the likelihood of ectopic beats. For people who cannot tolerate beta-blockers, nondihydropyridine calcium channel blockers such as verapamil can be used, but are potentially harmful in people who also have low blood pressure or severe shortness of breath at rest. These medications also decrease the heart rate, though their use in people with severe outflow obstruction, elevated pulmonary artery wedge pressure, and low blood pressure should be done with caution. Dihydropyridine calcium channel blockers should be avoided in people with evidence of obstruction. For people whose symptoms are not relieved by the above treatments, disopyramide can be considered for further symptom relief. Diuretics can be considered for people with evidence of fluid overload, though cautiously used in those with evidence of obstruction. Intravenous phenylephrine (or another pure vasoconstricting agent) can be used in the acute setting of low blood pressure in those with obstructive hypertrophic cardiomyopathy who do not respond to fluid administration. Potent negative inotropes have their effect of decreasing and delaying systolic anterior motion, and LVOT obstruction, by decreasing LV ejection flow acceleration, thereby reducing the displacing force on the mitral valve.

Cardiac myosin inhibitors reduce left ventricular contractility by inhibiting cardiac ATPase to decrease the number of active actin–myosin cross-bridges within the myocyte sarcomere. Mavacamten was shown to reduce left ventricular outflow tract gradient (a measure of obstruction) and improve symptoms in patients with obstructive hypertrophic cardiomyopathy, and was approved for medical use in the United States in April 2022. Mavacamten was also shown to reduce left ventricular wall thickness in those with hypertrophic cardiomyopathy and was associated with a lower need for septal reduction surgery. Aficamten, which has a shorter half life compared with mavacamten, achieves steady state within 2 weeks, and appears to have a wide therapeutic window, was shown to improve peak oxygen uptake during cardiopulmonary exercise testing in patients with New York Heart Association (NYHA) functional class II or III heart failure and decreased exercise capacity.

Aficamten (Myqorzo) was approved for medical use in the United States in December 2025, for the treatment of symptomatic obstructive hypertrophic cardiomyopathy.

=== Surgical septal myectomy ===
Surgical septal myectomy is an open-heart operation done to relieve symptoms in people who remain severely symptomatic despite medical therapy. It has been performed successfully since the early 1960s. Surgical septal myectomy uniformly decreases left ventricular outflow tract obstruction and improves symptoms, and in experienced centers has a surgical mortality of less than 1%, as well as 85% success rate. It involves a median sternotomy (opening the chest) and removing a portion of the interventricular septum. Surgical myectomy resection that focuses just on the subaortic septum, to increase the size of the outflow tract to reduce Venturi forces, may be inadequate to abolish systolic anterior motion (SAM) of the anterior leaflet of the mitral valve. With this limited resection, the residual mid-septal bulge still redirects flow posteriorly; SAM persists because flow still gets behind the mitral valve. It is only when the deeper portion of the septal bulge is resected that flow is redirected anteriorly away from the mitral valve, abolishing SAM. With this in mind, a modification of the Morrow myectomy termed extended myectomy, mobilization and partial excision of the papillary muscles has become the excision of choice. In patients with particularly large redundant mitral valves, anterior leaflet plication or residual leaflet excision (ReLex) may be selectively added to complete separation of the mitral valve and outflow. Complications of septal myectomy surgery include possible death, arrhythmias, infection, bleeding, septal perforation/defect, and stroke.

=== Alcohol septal ablation ===
Alcohol septal ablation, introduced by Ulrich Sigwart in 1994, is a percutaneous technique that involves an injection of alcohol into one or more septal branches of the left anterior descending artery. This is a catheter technique with results similar to the surgical septal myectomy procedure but is less invasive since it does not involve general anesthesia and opening of the chest wall and pericardium (which are done in a septal myectomy). In a select population with symptoms secondary to a high outflow tract gradient, alcohol septal ablation can reduce the symptoms of hypertrophic cardiomyopathy. In addition, older individuals and those with other medical problems, for whom surgical myectomy would pose an increased procedural risk, would likely benefit from the less-invasive septal ablation procedure.

When performed properly, an alcohol septal ablation induces a controlled heart attack, in which the portion of the interventricular septum that involves the left ventricular outflow tract is infarcted and will contract into a scar.

Alcohol septal ablation has a risk of secondary complete heart block as well as a greater need for repeated procedures due to persistent outflow tract obstruction. Septal reduction surgery and alcohol septal ablation have a similar risk of death related to procedural complications.

=== Mitral clip ===
Since 2013, mitral clips have been implanted via a catheter as a new strategy to correct the motion of the mitral valve in people with severe obstructive hypertrophic cardiomyopathy (HOCM). The device fastens together the mitral valve leaflets to improve the heart's blood outflow. The mitral clip has not yet established the same long-term reliability as septal myectomy or alcohol septal ablation, but hypertrophic cardiomyopathy specialists are increasingly offering the clip as a less-invasive treatment option.

=== Implantable pacemaker or defibrillator ===
The use of a pacemaker has been advocated in a subset of individuals, to cause asynchronous contraction of the left ventricle. Since the pacemaker activates the interventricular septum before the left ventricular free wall, the gradient across the left ventricular outflow tract may decrease. This form of treatment has been shown to provide less relief of symptoms and less of a reduction in the left ventricular outflow tract gradient when compared to surgical myectomy. Technological advancements have also led to the development of a dual-chamber pacemaker, which is only turned on when needed (in contrast to a regular pacemaker which provides a constant stimulus). Although the dual-chamber pacemaker has been shown to decrease ventricular outflow tract obstruction, experimental trials have found only a few individuals with improved symptoms. Researchers suspect that these reports of improved symptoms are due to a placebo effect.

The procedure includes an incision on the anterolateral area below the clavicle. Two leads are then inserted; one into the right atrium and the other into the right ventricular apex via the subclavian veins. Once in place, they are secured and attached to the generator which will remain inside the fascia, anterior to the pectoral muscle. Complications of this procedure include infection, electrical lead, and generator malfunction which will require replacement.

For people with hypertrophic cardiomyopathy who exhibit one or more of the major risk factors for sudden cardiac death, an implantable cardioverter-defibrillator (ICD) or a combination pacemaker/ICD all-in-one unit may be recommended as an appropriate precaution. In 2014, European Society of Cardiology suggested a practical risk score to calculate that risk.

=== Cardiac transplantation ===
In cases that are unresponsive to all other forms of treatment, cardiac transplantation is one option. It is also the only treatment available for end-stage heart failure. Studies have indicated a seven-year survival rate of 94% in people with hypertrophic cardiomyopathy after transplantation.

== Prognosis ==
The annual mortality rate in those with hypertrophic cardiomyopathy is 1%. 70% of those with hypertrophic cardiomyopathy have a left ventricular outflow tract obstruction (HOCM).

A family history of sudden cardiac death, left ventricular wall thickness greater than 30 milimeters, an aneurysm at the left ventricular apex, unexplained syncope (passing out), multiple episodes of sustained ventricular tachycardia, late gadolinium enhancement on cardiac MRI (a marker of heart muscle fibrosis or scar formation) and a left ventricular ejection fraction of less than 50% are all risk factors for sudden cardiac death in hypertrophic cardiomyopathy. The incidence of sudden cardiac death in those older than 60 with hypertrophic cardiomyopathy is rare.

About 25% of those with symptomatic hypertrophic cardiomyopathy have atrial fibrillation (in which the atrial chambers of the heart beat irregularly, and sometimes rapidly). Those with hypertrophic cardiomyopathy and atrial fibrillation have a worse prognosis, partly due to the loss of the contribution of atrial contractility to heart function and the fast heart rate impairing ventricular filling.

== Children ==
Even though hypertrophic cardiomyopathy may be present early in life and is most likely congenital, it is not commonly seen in pediatric cardiology, largely because the presentation of symptoms is usually absent, incomplete, or delayed into adulthood. Most of the information pertaining to hypertrophic cardiomyopathy arises from studies in adult populations, and the implication of these observations for the pediatric population is uncertain. Nonetheless, studies in pediatric cardiology have revealed that hypertrophic cardiomyopathy accounts for 42% of childhood cardiomyopathies, with an annual incidence rate of 0.47/100,000 in children. In asymptomatic cases, sudden death is considered one of the most-feared complications associated with the disease. Consequently, the recommended practice is to screen children of affected individuals throughout childhood to detect cardiac abnormalities at an early stage, in the hope of preventing further complications of the disease.

Generally, the diagnosis of hypertrophic cardiomyopathy in a pediatric population is made during assessment for murmur, congestive heart failure, physical exhaustion, and genetic testing of children of affected individuals. Echocardiography is used to assess left ventricular wall thickness, ventricular size, systolic and diastolic heart function, and outflow tract obstruction to diagnose hypertrophic cardiomyopathy in children.

For children with hypertrophic cardiomyopathy, treatment strategies aim to reduce disease symptoms and lower the risk of sudden death. Due to the heterogeneity of the disease, treatment is usually modified according to individual's needs. β-blockers improve left ventricular filling and relaxation and thereby lessen symptoms. In some children, β–blockers were shown effective in reducing the risk of sudden death. Calcium channel blockers (verapamil) and antiarrhythmic drugs may be used as an adjunct therapy to β-blockers in symptomatic children. Septal myectomy, if required for treatment, is considered safe in children.

== Epidemiology ==
The prevalence of hypertrophic cardiomyopathy in the general population globally is 0.2% (1 in 500 adults), as determined by echocardiographic studies. Hypertrophic cardiomyopathy is more common in males than females. The most common presentation of hypertrophic cardiomyopathy is in the third decade of life, though it can present at any age, from newborns to the elderly.

== Other animals ==
Echocardiography of hypertrophic-obstructive cardiomyopathy (HOCM) in a cat.

Saddle thrombus in the feline aorta. 1 opened Aorta with thrombus, 2 A. iliaca externa, 3 common trunk for both Aa. iliacae internae, 4 A. circumflexa ilium profunda, 5 A. mesenterica caudalis, 6 Colon descendens.

=== Cats ===
Feline hypertrophic cardiomyopathy (HCM) is the most common heart disease in domestic cats; the disease process and genetics are believed to be similar to the disease in humans. In Maine Coon cats, HCM has been confirmed as an autosomal dominant inherited trait. Numerous cat breeds have HCM as a problem in the breed. The first genetic mutation (in cardiac myosin binding protein C) responsible for feline HCM was discovered in 2005 in Maine Coon cats. A test for this mutation (A31P) is available. About one-third of Maine Coon cats tested for the mutation are either heterozygous or homozygous for the mutation, although many of the cats that are heterozygous have no overt evidence of the disease on an echocardiogram (low penetrance).

Some Maine Coon cats with clinical evidence of hypertrophic cardiomyopathy test negative for this mutation, strongly suggesting that another cause exists in the breed. The cardiac myosin binding protein C mutation identified in Maine Coon cats has not been found in any other breed of cat with HCM, but more recently another myosin binding protein C mutation has been identified in Ragdoll cats with HCM. As in humans, feline HCM is not present at birth but develops over time. It has been identified for the first time in cats as young as 6 months of age and at least as old as 7 years of age.

Clinically, cats with hypertrophic cardiomyopathy commonly have a systolic anterior motion (SAM) of the mitral valve (see graphic). Cats with severe HCM often develop left heart failure (pulmonary edema; pleural effusion) because of severe diastolic dysfunction of the left ventricle. They may also develop a left atrial thrombus that embolizes, most commonly, to the terminal aorta creating acute pain and rear limb paralysis (see below). Sudden death can also occur but appears to be uncommon.

Ultrasound of the heart (echocardiography) is necessary to diagnose HCM in cats. Measurement of circulating cardiac biomarkers, like N‐terminal‐proBNP (NT‐proBNP) and troponin I (TnI) may be used in cats to strengthen the suspicion of cardiac disease. There is a point-of-care test for feline NT-proBNP available which can be used at the veterinary clinic when echocardiography is not possible to perform.

Cats that are tachycardic (>220) and/or have outflow obstruction (SAM) on echo should probably be treated but there is no cure for feline HCM. Many but not all cats have a heart murmur. Many cats that have a heart murmur do not have HCM. Frequently the first signs that a cat has HCM are tachypnea/dyspnea due to heart failure or acute pain and paralysis due to systemic thromboembolism. While medication is commonly given to cats with HCM that have no clinical signs, no medication is helpful at this stage and it has been shown that an ACE inhibitor is not beneficial until heart failure is present (at which time a diuretic is most beneficial). Diltiazem generally produces no demonstrable benefit. Atenolol is commonly administered when a severe systolic anterior motion of the mitral valve is present.

Feline arterial thromboembolism (FATE) is a relatively common and devastating complication of feline hypertrophic cardiomyopathy and other feline cardiomyopathies. The thrombus generally forms in the left atrium, most commonly the left auricle. The formation is thought to be primarily due to blood flow stasis. Classically, the thromboembolism lodges at the iliac trifurcation of the aorta, occluding either one or both of the common iliac arteries. Because this split is called the saddle, and is the most frequent location for the thrombus, FATE is commonly known as saddle thrombus. Clinically this presents as a cat with complete loss of function in one or both hind limbs. The hind limbs are cold and the cat is in considerable pain. Emboli may, rarely, lodge in other locations, most commonly the right front limb and the renal arteries.

Clopidogrel is used to try to prevent left atrial thrombus formation in cats with hypertrophic cardiomyopathy and a large left atrium. The FATCAT study at Purdue University demonstrated that it is superior to aspirin for the prevention of a second thrombus from forming in cats that have already experienced a clot. Thrombolytic agents (e.g., tissue plasminogen activator) have been used with some success to break down existing aortic thromboembolism, but their cost is high and the outcome appears to be no better than giving a cat time (48–72 hours) to break down its own clot. Pain management is extremely important. The prognosis for cats with FATE is often poor as they are likely to have significant hypertrophic cardiomyopathy already and a recurrent bout of FATE is likely. For this reason, euthanasia is often a valid consideration.

=== Gorillas ===
In July 2013, Rigo, a 42-year-old western lowland gorilla, resident in Melbourne Zoo and father of Mzuri, the first gorilla born by artificial insemination, died unexpectedly as a result of hypertrophic cardiomyopathy. The condition is not uncommon in male gorillas over the age of 30, and in many cases, there is no sign of the disease until the individual's sudden death.
