= Data fabrication =

Intentional misrepresentation of research results

In scientific inquiry and academic research, data fabrication is the intentional misrepresentation of research results. As with other forms of scientific misconduct, it is the intent to deceive that marks fabrication as unethical, and thus different from scientists deceiving themselves. There are many ways data can be fabricated. Experimental data can be fabricated by reporting experiments that were never conducted, and accurate data can be manipulated or misrepresented to suit a desired outcome. One of the biggest problems with this form of scientific fraud is that "university investigations into research misconduct are often inadequate, opaque and poorly conducted. They challenge the idea that institutions can police themselves on research integrity."

Sometimes intentional fabrication can be difficult to distinguish from unintentional academic incompetence or malpractice. Examples of this include the failure to account for measurement error, or the failure to adequately control experiments for any parameters being measured.

Fabrication can also occur in the context of undergraduate or graduate studies wherein a student fabricates a laboratory or homework assignment. Such cheating, when discovered, is usually handled within the institution, and does not become a scandal within the larger academic community (as cheating by students seldom has any academic significance).

== Consequences ==
A finding that a scientist engaged in fabrication will often mean the end to their career as a researcher. Scientific misconduct is grounds for dismissal of tenured faculty, as well as for forfeiture of research grants. Given the tight-knit nature of many academic communities, and the high stakes involved, researchers who are found to have committed fabrication are often effectively (and permanently) blacklisted from the profession, with reputable research organizations and universities refusing to hire them; funding sources refusing to sponsor them or their work, and journals refusing to consider any of their articles for publication. In some cases, however, especially if the researcher is senior and well-established, the academic community can close ranks to prevent injury to the scientist's career.

Fabricators may also have previously earned academic credentials removed. Two cases:

- In 2004, Jan Hendrik Schön was stripped of his doctorate degree by the University of Konstanz after a committee formed by Bell Labs found him guilty of fabrication related to research done during his employment there. This action was undertaken even though Schön was not accused (in the matter in question) of any fabrication or other misconduct relating to his work which led to or supported the degree—the doctorate was revoked, according to University officials, solely due to Schön behaving "unworthily" in the Bell Labs affair.
- In 2001, peer reviewers at the academic journal Nutrition raised suspicions about a publication draft submitted by Dr. Ranjit Chandra, a world-renowned Canadian nutrition researcher at Memorial University of Newfoundland. It was confirmed through investigation that Dr. Chandra had published the results of a series of studies, stretching over more than a decade, which reported claims based on incorrectly represented analysis of, in some cases, non-existent data. By that time, Dr. Chandra had already been invited to the Order of Canada, which was subsequently revoked in 2015. Dr. Chandra retired in 2002, and Memorial University established the Marilyn Harvey Award to Recognize the Importance of Research Ethics in honour of the nurse researcher who first raised the alarm about Dr. Chandra's findings in the early 1990s.

Not all alleged fraud is found to be so, and debates are part of the scientific community. An interesting case is the accusation against Dr. Margaret Mead, a world-renowned anthropologist who published field work conducted early in her life, which proclaimed that Samoan culture was more relaxed and harmonious about sexual relations and mores. Her truthfulness and research process were roundly criticized by a later researcher in Samoa, Dr. Derek Freeman. More recently, Dr. Freeman's own research quality has come under scrutiny, with a hint that perhaps his own views on sexuality and his research with Elders in Samoa led him to reject Dr. Mead's findings. Dr. Freeman's allegations harmed Dr. Mead's reputation at a time when few women were scientists

== See also ==
- Cyril Burt
- Junk science
- Research Integrity Risk Index
- Research paper mill
- Retraction
