= Myosin light chain =

Small polypeptide subunit of myosin

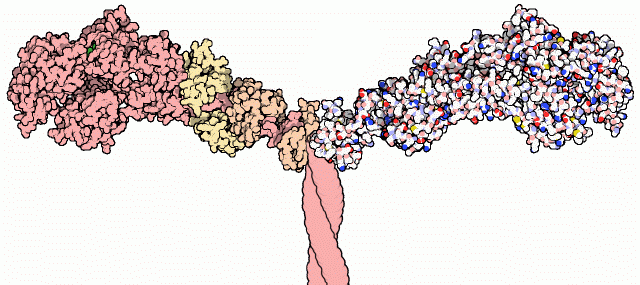
Part of the myosin II structure. Atoms in the heavy chain are colored red on the left-hand side, and atoms in the light chains are colored orange and yellow.

A myosin light chain is a light chain (small polypeptide subunit) of myosin. Myosin light chains were discovered by Chinese biochemist Cao Tianqin (Tien-chin Tsao) when he was a graduate student at the University of Cambridge in England.

== Structure and function ==
=== Myosin light chain classes ===
Structurally, myosin light chains belong to the EF-hand family, a large family of Ca^{2+}- binding proteins. MLCs contain two Ca^{2+} - binding EF-hand motifs. MLCs isoforms modulate the Ca^{2+}of force transduction and cross-bridge kinetics.

Myosin light chains (MLCs) can be broadly classified into two groups:

- Essential or alkali MLC (MLC1 or ELC),
- Regulatory MLC (MLC2 or RLC).

Essential and regulatory MLCs have molecular masses of 22 and 19 kDa, respectively. Structurally, MLC2 contains a serine residue that is lacking in MLC1. The presence of this amino acids allows the regulation of the conformational changes (from compacted to an elongated form) by a Ca^{2+}-mediated phosphorylation mechanism. MLC1, in contrast with MLC2, has a N-terminal sequence able to bind actin, contributing to force production.

MLCs are structurally and functionally distinct from myosin heavy chains (MHCs). Nevertheless, the association of MLCs with the neck region of MHCs is necessary for the assembly of the macromolecular complexes that result in the functional motor protein, myosin. The interaction of MLCs with the α-helical neck region of MHC molecule stabilizes the complex.

== Genes in mammalians ==
To this day, eight genes encoding for MLCs in mammalians have been described; several isoforms have also been characterized. Four out of the 8 genes are MLC1 genes, whilst the remaining are MLC2 genes.

MLC1 genes:

- MYL1 (chromosome 2q24.11); expressed in striated muscle
- MYL3 (chromosome 3p21.3); expressed in striated muscle
- MYL4 (chromosome 17q21.32); expressed in striated muscle
- MYL6 (chromosome 12q13.2); expressed in non-muscle and smooth muscle

MLC2 genes:

- MYL2 (chromosome 12q24.11); found in the sarcomere
- MYL5 (chromosome 4p16.3); found in the sarcomere
- MYL7 (chromosome 12q13.2); found in the sarcomere
- MYL9 (chromosome 20q11.23); expressed in smooth muscle

Other proteins and enzymes related to MLC function have been described. Among them are, for example, MYL6B, MYLIP, MYLK, and MYLK2,

== Diseases associated with MLCs ==
Several diseases have been associated with mutations in the genes encoding for myosin light chain proteins. The majority of these diseases are cardiomyopathies, such as hypertrophic (HCM) or dilated (DCM) cardiomyopathy and sudden cardiac death. Mutations in MYL2 and MYL3 have been reported for these diseases.

One study, published in 2012, found that valvular myosin 'LC1', in the hearts of three patients with valvular heart diseases, had structures similar to those of valvular myosin of people who were in their early stages of DCMP and HCMP. The researchers hypothesized that the structure distortion of these valvular myosin were due to adaptational changes by the body in an attempt to improve the functioning of the heart.

== MLCKs as Biological Drugs ==
Myosin light chain kinase (MLCK) inhibitors are one of the few peptides that can cross the plasma membrane relatively quickly. Under stressful conditions, MLCK's in the human body promotes increased permeability of microvessels. It is thought that MLCK phosphorylates endothelial myosin, leading to cell contraction. This reaction prevents disengaged cells that are adjacent to one another from reestablishing connections, thus contributing to the maintenance of the gaps between cells. With their strong ability to cross the plasma membrane with little resistance from the cell, along with their specificity for a single target-substrate, MLCK inhibitors can potentially evolve into novel antiedemic drugs.

== Interaction of MLCs with non-myosin proteins ==
MYL9, MYL12a, and MYL12b (MYL9/12) have been described as new functional interaction partners with CD69 in the pathogenesis of inflammation of the airways.

A novel mechanism of activated T cell recruitment into inflammatory tissues has been proposed, known was "CD69/Myl9/12 system". The proposed mechanism state that "Myl9/12-containing net-like structures are created in inflammatory vessels, which play an important role as a platform for recruitment of CD69-expressing leukocytes into inflammatory tissues. T cells that are activated in the lymph nodes proliferate, down-regulate CD69 expression, and then leave the lymph nodes to migrate into inflammatory sites in an S1PR1-dependent manner."

The proposed mechanisms of action of CD69/Myl9/12 system are related to the regulation of airway inflammatory processes and thus can prove to be a novel therapeutic target for chronic inflammatory diseases, in general.

== See also ==
- Myosin light-chain kinase
- Myosin-light-chain phosphatase
