= MYH10 =

Protein-coding gene in the species Homo sapiens

Identifiers
- Aliases: MYH10, NMMHC-IIB, NMMHCB, myosin, heavy chain 10, non-muscle, myosin heavy chain 10
- External IDs: OMIM: 160776; MGI: 1930780; GeneCards: MYH10
Available structures
PDB	Ortholog search: PDBe RCSB
PDB	List of PDB id codes 4PD3

Gene location (Human)
Chr.	Chromosome 17 (human)
Band	17p13.1	Start	8,474,207 bp
Band	17p13.1	End	8,631,376 bp

Gene location (Mouse)
Chr.	Chromosome 11 (mouse)
Band	11 B3|11 41.95 cM	Start	68,582,385 bp
Band	11 B3|11 41.95 cM	End	68,707,458 bp
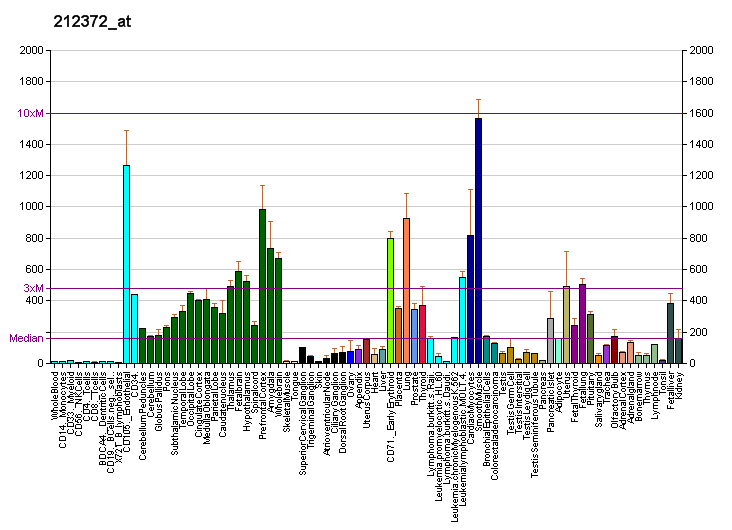
RNA expression pattern
Bgee	Human / Mouse (ortholog); Top expressed in: saphenous vein; right coronary artery; ascending aorta; Descending thoracic aorta; middle temporal gyrus; Brodmann area 23; vena cava; lateral nuclear group of thalamus; visceral pleura; endothelial cell / Top expressed in: genital tubercle; ventricular zone; ganglionic eminence; tail of embryo; cerebellar cortex; superior frontal gyrus; yolk sac; dentate gyrus of hippocampal formation granule cell; bone marrow; blastocyst; More reference expression data
BioGPS	More reference expression data
Gene ontology
Molecular function	nucleotide binding; ADP binding; calmodulin binding; actin filament binding; microfilament motor activity; protein binding; actin binding; cytoskeletal motor activity; ATP binding; ATPase activity; RNA stem-loop binding; mRNA 5'-UTR binding; microtubule motor activity; microtubule binding
Cellular component	cytosol; myosin II filament; cell projection; midbody; cleavage furrow; actomyosin; extracellular exosome; nucleus; myosin complex; lamellipodium; stress fiber; cytoplasm; cell cortex; myosin II complex; spindle; polysome; plasma membrane; brush border; axon; growth cone; neuromuscular junction; neuron projection; soma; dendritic spine; glutamatergic synapse
Biological process	actomyosin structure organization; actin filament-based movement; cell adhesion; regulation of cell shape; mitotic cytokinesis; in utero embryonic development; neuron migration; plasma membrane repair; cardiac septum development; exocytosis; substrate-dependent cell migration, cell extension; nuclear migration; axonogenesis; axon guidance; brain development; development of the heart; adult heart development; cell population proliferation; fourth ventricle development; lateral ventricle development; third ventricle development; cerebellar Purkinje cell layer development; actin cytoskeleton organization; myofibril assembly; neuron projection development; aorta development; positive regulation of protein secretion; neuromuscular process controlling balance; cardiac myofibril assembly; ventricular cardiac muscle cell development; retina development in camera-type eye; coronary vasculature development; modification of postsynaptic actin cytoskeleton; postsynaptic actin cytoskeleton organization; microtubule-based movement
Sources:Amigo / QuickGO
Orthologs
Databases	NCBI: entry; OMA: entry
Species	Human	Mouse
Entrez	4628	77579
Ensembl	ENSG00000133026	ENSMUSG00000020900
UniProt	P35580	Q61879
RefSeq (mRNA)	NM_001256012; NM_001256095; NM_005964; NM_001375266	NM_175260
RefSeq (protein)	NP_001242941; NP_001243024; NP_005955; NP_001362195	NP_780469
Location (UCSC)	Chr 17: 8.47 – 8.63 Mb	Chr 11: 68.58 – 68.71 Mb
PubMed search
- Wikidata
View/Edit Human	View/Edit Mouse

Myosin-10 also known as myosin heavy chain 10 or non-muscle myosin IIB (NM-IIB) is a protein that in humans is encoded by the MYH10 gene. Non-muscle myosins are expressed in a wide variety of tissues, but NM-IIB is the only non-muscle myosin II isoform expressed in cardiac muscle, where it localizes to adherens junctions within intercalated discs. NM-IIB is essential for normal development of cardiac muscle and for integrity of intercalated discs. Mutations in MYH10 have been identified in patients with left atrial enlargement.

== Structure ==
NM-IIB is 228.9 kDa protein composed of 1976 amino acids. NM-IIB has an N-terminal globular head that harbors the catalytically active, magnesium(Mg)-ATPase. The C-terminal rod domain is an alpha helical coiled-coil that can multimerize with other myosin molecules to form a filament. Bound to the neck region of NM-IIB are two light chains; first, MLC17 stabilizes the molecule, while the second light chain, MLC20, modulates contraction. The exception to this rule is the alternatively spliced NM-IIB2 isoform, which has a 21 amino acid inserted into loop 2, near the actin-binding domain; actomyosin MgATPase activity of this isoform is not enhanced by phosphorylation of the regulatory light chain MLC20.

NM-IIB is part of the larger myosin II subfamily of proteins, which also includes skeletal muscle, cardiac muscle and smooth muscle myosins. NM-IIB, and non-muscle myosins in general, are widely expressed in every tissue in humans.

== Function ==
NM-IIB has many properties that are similar to those of smooth muscle myosins, such as the permissive nature of phosphorylation of the 20 kDa regulatory light chain for contraction. In skeletal muscle and cardiac muscle myosins, contraction is activated through thin filament proteins troponin and tropomyosin, whereas in NM-IIB and smooth muscle myosin, contraction initiates via regulatory light chain (MLC20) phosphorylation.

Various functions of NM-IIB require the phosphorylation of the regulatory light chain MLC20, including cell migration and cell adhesion. The two primary kinases catalyzing this reaction are the calcium-calmodulin-dependent, myosin light chain kinase and the Rho-GTP dependent, Rho kinase (ROCK). NM-IIB is dephosphorylated by a myosin phosphatase.

Detailed kinetic studies on NM-IIB show that this isoform of non-muscle myosin II has a slower actomyosin ATPase cycle relative to other myosin II isoforms, and that the markedly high affinity of NM-IIB head for ADP as well as the slow rate of ADP release can mechanistically explain affinity this finding. These data indicate that NM-IIB spends a large amount of its kinetic cycle in a configuration where it is strongly attached to actin.

NM-IIB, along with the other non-muscle myosin isoforms IIA and IIC, play a role in cell-cell and cell-matrix adhesion, cell migration, cell polarity, and embryonic stem cell apoptosis. Insights into the function of NM-IIB specifically have come from studies employing transgenic animals. NM-IIB is clearly required for normal development of cardiac muscle. Targeted gene disruption of NM-IIB resulted in approximately 65% embryonic lethality, and those that survived suffered from congestive heart failure and died day 1 following birth. Feature observed in NM-IIB knockouts was an increase in the transverse diameters of cardiomyocytes, ventricular septal defects, as well as other muscular abnormalities. NM-IIB is expressed early during embryonic development in cardiomyocytes, and appears to play a role in karyokinesis; ablation of NM-IIB caused defects in chromatid segregation and mitotic spindle formation, as well as abnormal structure of centrosomes.

In adult cardiomyocytes, NM-IIB redistributes from a diffuse cytoplasmic pattern in development to a localized Z-disc and intercalated disc distribution, where it colocalizes with alpha-actinin. NM-IIB is the only non-muscle myosin II isoform expressed in adult cardiac muscle (both IIa and IIB are expressed in skeletal muscle Z-discs, suggesting a specific function of NM-IIB in this cell type. NM-IIB may play a role in formation of mature sarcomeres in myofibrils. It appears that NM-IIB plays an essential role in maintaining normal adherens junction integrity and structure. A cardiac muscle-specific knockout of NM-IIB using the alpha-myosin heavy chain promoter-driven cre-recombinase develop enlarged cardiomyocytes, consistent with the defects previously observed with cytokinesis; widened adherens junctions; and progressive hypertrophic cardiomyopathy at 6 months. These data indicate that NM-IIB functions in ensuring the proper maintenance of intercalated disc structures.

== Clinical Significance ==
Single nucleotide polymorphisms in MYH10 were detected in patients with left atrial enlargement. MYH10 was identified to be a susceptibility gene using non-biased genome-wide linkage and peak-wide association analysis.

== Interactions ==
MYH10 has been shown to interact with:

- MYL6 and
- MYL9.
