= MYL7 =

Protein-coding gene in the species Homo sapiens

Identifiers
- Aliases: MYL7, MYL2A, MYLC2A, myosin light chain 7
- External IDs: OMIM: 613993; MGI: 107495; GeneCards: MYL7

Gene location (Human)
Chr.	Chromosome 7 (human)
Band	7p13	Start	44,138,864 bp
Band	7p13	End	44,141,332 bp

Gene location (Mouse)
Chr.	Chromosome 11 (mouse)
Band	11 A1|11 3.88 cM	Start	5,846,637 bp
Band	11 A1|11 3.88 cM	End	5,848,782 bp
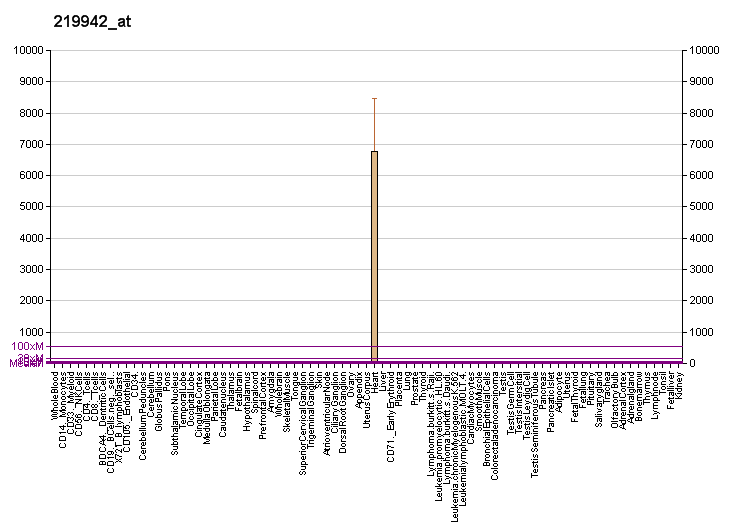
RNA expression pattern
Bgee	Human / Mouse (ortholog); Top expressed in: cardiac muscle tissue of right atrium; right auricle of heart; apex of heart; vena cava; left ventricle; right ventricle; myocardium of left ventricle; anterior pituitary; gonad; right hemisphere of cerebellum / Top expressed in: atrium; atrioventricular valve; endocardial cushion; aortic valve; interventricular septum; right atrium; right lung; left atrium; right lung lobe; left lung; More reference expression data
BioGPS	More reference expression data
Gene ontology
Molecular function	calcium ion binding; protein binding; metal ion binding
Cellular component	cytosol; dendritic spine; A band; myosin complex
Biological process	muscle contraction
Sources:Amigo / QuickGO
Orthologs
Databases	NCBI: entry; OMA: entry
Species	Human	Mouse
Entrez	58498	17898
Ensembl	ENSG00000106631	ENSMUSG00000020469
UniProt	Q01449	Q9QVP4
RefSeq (mRNA)	NM_021223	NM_022879
RefSeq (protein)	NP_067046	NP_075017
Location (UCSC)	Chr 7: 44.14 – 44.14 Mb	Chr 11: 5.85 – 5.85 Mb
PubMed search
- Wikidata
View/Edit Human	View/Edit Mouse

Atrial Light Chain-2 (ALC-2) also known as Myosin regulatory light chain 2, atrial isoform (MLC2a) is a protein that in humans is encoded by the MYL7 gene. ALC-2 expression is restricted to cardiac muscle atria in healthy individuals, where it functions to modulate cardiac development and contractility. In human diseases, including hypertrophic cardiomyopathy, dilated cardiomyopathy, ischemic cardiomyopathy and others, ALC-2 expression is altered.

== Structure ==
Human ALC-2 protein has a molecular weight of 19.4 kDa and is composed of 175 amino acids. ALC-2 is an EF hand protein that binds to the neck region of alpha myosin heavy chain. ALC-2 and the ventricular isoform, VLC-2, share 59% homology, showing significant differences at their N-termini and at the regulatory phosphorylation site(s), Serine-15 and Serine/Asparagine-14.

== Function ==
ALC-2 expression has proven to be a useful marker of cardiac muscle chamber distinction, development and differentiation. ALC-2 shows a pattern distinct from atrial essential light chain (ALC-1) during cardiogenesis. ALC-2 expression in adult murine hearts is cardiac-specific throughout embryonic days 8-16, and from day 12 and on is restricted to atria, showing very low levels in aorta and undetectable in ventricles, skeletal muscle, uterus, and liver. This atrial patterning occurs prior to septation. Expression of ALC-2 has been shown to correlate with expression of alpha-myosin heavy chain in cardiac atria of non-human primates.

ALC-2 and VLC-2 appear to function in the stabilization of thick filaments and regulation of contractility in the vertebrate heart. Functional insights into ALC-2 function have come from studies employing transgenesis. A study in which the ventricular isoform of regulatory light chain was overexpressed to replace the ALC-2 in cardiac atria was performed. This substitution resulted in atrial myocytes that contract and relax more forcefully and quickly, resulting in atrial cardiomyocytes that behave as ventricular cardiomyocytes.

In disease models, ALC-2 expression in some instances can be downregulated and replaced by the ventricular isoform (VLC-2). In spontaneously hypertensive rats, VLC-2 mRNA expression is three times higher in atria; and this change precedes any detectable pressure overloading of the heart, suggesting that this change is a very early functional adaptation to cardiac hypertrophy. Moreover, in a porcine model of atrial fibrillation, VLC-2 mRNA expression showed the greatest change, being upregulated 9.4-fold and 7.3-fold in left and right atria, respectively. In a porcine model of left atrial remodeling following mitral regurgitation, VLC-2 was shown to be upregulated.

Human ALC-2 is phosphorylated at its N-terminus at Serine-15 by a cardiac-specific myosin light chain kinase; ALC-2 has a serine at position 14, which is an Asparagine in the ventricular isoform that is shown to be deamidated (thus producing a negative charge similar to phosphorylation). Whether serine-14 of human ALC-2 is also phosphorylated remains to be determined. Endogenous phosphorylation level is around 30% of the total ALC-2. Alpha(1)-adrenergic stimulation by phenylephrine in atrial muscle strips showed an 80% increase in ALC-2 phosphorylation coordinate with enhanced contractile force, which was inhibited by both Rho kinase and myosin light chain kinase inhibition. In a canine model of atrial fibrillation, decreased atrial contractility was associated with decreased ALC-2 and myosin binding protein C phosphorylation. Moreover, the slow force response induced by stretch in human atrial muscle was shown to be modulated by enhanced phosphorylation of ALC-2 by myosin light chain kinase.

== Clinical Significance ==
Patients with hypertrophic cardiomyopathy shown an increased expression of ALC-2 in whole heart tissue. In patients with mitral valve disease, ischemic cardiomyopathy, dilated cardiomyopathy, coronary heart disease and pressure overload-induced cardiac hypertrophy, ALC-2 was shown to be replaced with VLC-2 in cardiac atria; in dilated cardiomyopathy, this change was concomitant with enhanced sensitivity of atrial fibers to calcium.

In patients with congenital atrial septal defect carrying a missense mutation Ile820Asn in alpha myosin heavy chain, it was shown that binding of ALC-2 to alpha myosin heavy chain is disrupted.

== Interactions ==
ALC-2 is shown to interact with:

- MYH6
