= MYL2 =

Protein-coding gene in the species Homo sapiens

Identifiers
- Aliases: MYL2, CMH10, MLC2, MLC-2s/v, myosin light chain 2, MFM12
- External IDs: OMIM: 160781; MGI: 97272; GeneCards: MYL2

Gene location (Human)
Chr.	Chromosome 12 (human)
Band	12q24.11	Start	110,910,819 bp
Band	12q24.11	End	110,921,443 bp

Gene location (Mouse)
Chr.	Chromosome 5 (mouse)
Band	5|5 F	Start	122,100,951 bp
Band	5|5 F	End	122,113,472 bp
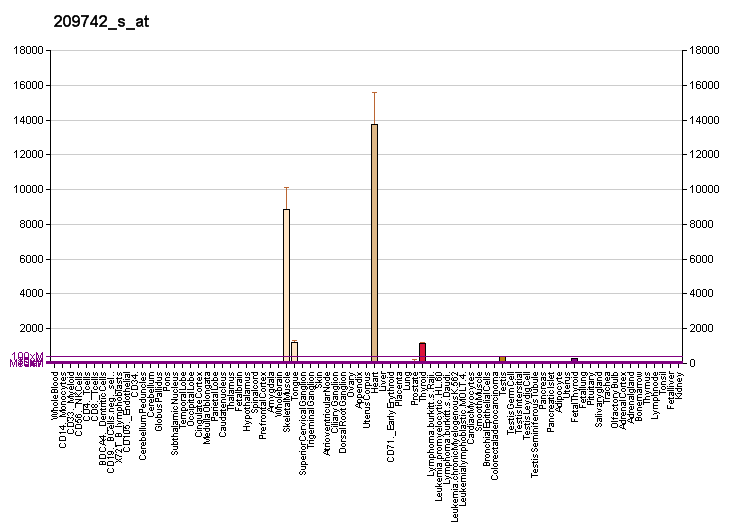
RNA expression pattern
Bgee	Human / Mouse (ortholog); Top expressed in: right ventricle; apex of heart; thoracic diaphragm; Skeletal muscle tissue of biceps brachii; Skeletal muscle tissue of rectus abdominis; muscle of thigh; tibialis anterior muscle; glutes; triceps brachii muscle; deltoid muscle / Top expressed in: cardiac muscle tissue of left ventricle; interventricular septum; right ventricle; atrioventricular valve; soleus muscle; plantaris muscle; endocardial cushion; semi-lunar valve; aortic valve; ankle; More reference expression data
BioGPS	More reference expression data
Gene ontology
Molecular function	calcium ion binding; actin monomer binding; metal ion binding; myosin heavy chain binding; protein binding; structural constituent of muscle
Cellular component	cytoplasm; cytosol; sarcomere; myofibril; actin cytoskeleton; A band; cytoskeleton; myosin complex; cardiac myofibril
Biological process	cardiac muscle contraction; positive regulation of the force of heart contraction; regulation of the force of heart contraction; heart morphogenesis; post-embryonic development; cardiac myofibril assembly; ventricular cardiac muscle tissue morphogenesis; development of the heart; regulation of striated muscle contraction; negative regulation of cell growth; muscle filament sliding; muscle cell fate specification; heart contraction
Sources:Amigo / QuickGO
Orthologs
Databases	NCBI: entry; OMA: entry
Species	Human	Mouse
Entrez	4633	17906
Ensembl	ENSG00000111245	ENSMUSG00000013936
UniProt	P10916	P51667
RefSeq (mRNA)	NM_000432	NM_010861
RefSeq (protein)	NP_000423	NP_034991; NP_001371255; NP_001371256; NP_001371257; NP_001371258 NP_001371259; NP_001371260
Location (UCSC)	Chr 12: 110.91 – 110.92 Mb	Chr 5: 122.1 – 122.11 Mb
PubMed search
- Wikidata
View/Edit Human	View/Edit Mouse

Myosin regulatory light chain 2, ventricular/cardiac muscle isoform (MLC-2) also known as the regulatory light chain of myosin (RLC) is a protein that in humans is encoded by the MYL2 gene. This cardiac ventricular RLC isoform is distinct from that expressed in skeletal muscle (MYLPF), smooth muscle (MYL12B) and cardiac atrial muscle (MYL7).

Ventricular myosin light chain-2 (MLC-2v) refers to the ventricular cardiac muscle form of myosin light chain 2 (Myl2). MLC-2v is a 19-KDa protein composed of 166 amino acids, that belongs to the EF-hand Ca^{2+} binding superfamily. MLC-2v interacts with the neck/tail region of the muscle thick filament protein myosin to regulate myosin motility and function.

== Structure ==
Cardiac, ventricular RLC is an 18.8 kDa protein composed of 166 amino acids. RLC and the second ventricular light chain, essential light chain (ELC, MYL3), are non-covalently bound to IQXXXRGXXXR motifs in the 9 nm S1-S2 lever arm of the myosin head, both alpha (MYH6) and beta (MYH7) isoforms. Both light chains are members of the EF-hand superfamily of proteins, which possess two helix-loop-helix motifs in two globular domains connected by an alpha-helical linker.

== Function ==
The N-terminal EF-hand domain of RLC binds calcium/magnesium at activating concentrations, however the dissociation rate is too slow to modulate cardiac contractility on a beat-by-beat basis. Perturbing the calcium binding region of RLC through site-directed mutagenesis (D47A) decreased tension and stiffness in isolated, skinned skeletal muscle fibers, suggesting that the conformational change induced by calcium binding to RLC is functionally important.

Another mode of RLC modulation lies in its ability to be modified by phosphorylation and deamidation in the N-terminal region, resulting in significant charge alterations of the protein. RLC is phosphorylated by a cardiac-specific myosin light chain kinase (MYLK3), which was recently cloned. Studies have supported a role for myosin phosphatase targeting subunit 2 (MYPT2, PPP1R12B) in the dephosphorylation of RLC. Human RLC has an asparagine at position 14 (threonine in mouse) and a serine at position 15 (same in mouse). Endogenous RLC exists as a mixture of unmodified (typically ~50%), singly-modified (either N14 deamidation or S15 phosphorylation) and doubly modified (N14 deamidation and S15 phosphorylation) protein. Both deamidation and phosphorylation contribute negative charge to the N-terminal region of RLC, undoubtedly altering its interaction with the C-terminal MYH7 alpha helical domain. Functional studies have supported a role for RLC phosphorylation in modulating cardiac myosin crossbridge kinetics. It is well established that RLC phosphorylation enhances myofilament sensitivity to calcium in isometrically-contracting, skinned cardiac fibers. It was also demonstrated that a lack of RLC phosphorylation decreases tension cost (isometric force/ATPase rate at a given pCa), suggesting that RLC phosphorylation augments cycling kinetics of myosin. It has been proposed that RLC phosphorylation promotes a "swing-out" of myosin heads, facilitating weak-to-strong crossbridge binding to actin per unit calcium. Additional insights regarding RLC phosphorylation in beating hearts have come from in vivo studies. Adult mice expressing a non-phosphorylatable cardiac RLC (TG-RLC(P-)) exhibited significant decreases in load-dependent and load-independent measures of contractility. In TG-RLC(P-), the time for the heart to reach peak elastance during ejection was elongated, ejection capacity was decreased and the inotropic response to dobutamine was blunted. It is also clear that ablation of RLC phosphorylation in vivo induces alterations in the phosphorylation of other sarcomeric proteins, namely cardiac myosin binding protein C and cardiac troponin I. Moreover, RLC phosphorylation, specifically, appears to be necessary for a normal inotropic response to dobutamine. In agreement with these findings, a second in vivo model, cardiac myosin light chain kinase (MYLK3) knockout (cMLCK neo/neo), showed depressed fractional shortening, progressing to left ventricular hypertrophy by 4–5 months of age. Taken together, these studies clearly demonstrate that RLC phosphorylation regulates cardiac dynamics in beating hearts, and is critical for eliciting a normal sympathetic response.

== Expression patterns during cardiac development ==
MLC-2v plays an essential role in early embryonic cardiac development and function. and represents one of the earliest markers of ventricular specification. During early development (E7.5-8.0), MLC-2v is expressed within the cardiac crescent. The expression pattern of MLC-2v becomes restricted to the ventricular segment of the linear heart tube at E8.0 and remains restricted within the ventricle into adulthood.

== Phosphorylation sites and regulators ==
Recent studies have highlighted a critical role for MLC2v phosphorylation in cardiac torsion, function and disease. In cardiac muscle, the critical phosphorylation sites have been identified as Ser14/Ser15 in the mouse heart and Ser15 in the human heart. The major kinase responsible for MLC-2v phosphorylation has been identified as cardiac myosin light chain kinase (MLCK), encoded for by Mylk3. Loss of cardiac MLCK in mice results in loss of cardiac MLC-2v phosphorylation and cardiac abnormalities.

== Clinical significance ==
Mutations in MYL2 have been associated with familial hypertrophic cardiomyopathy (FHC). Ten FHC mutations have been identified in RLC: E22K, A13T, N47K, P95A, F18L, R58Q, IVS6-1G>C, L103E, IVS5-2A>G, D166V. The first three-E22K, A13T and N47K-have been associated with an unusual mid-ventricular chamber obstruction type of hypertrophy. Three mutations-R58Q, D166V and IVS5-2-are associated with more malignant outcomes, manifesting with sudden cardiac death or at earlier ages. Functional studies demonstrate that FHC mutations in RLC affect its ability to both be phosphorylated and to bind calcium/magnesium.

=== Effects on cardiac muscle contraction ===
MLC-2v plays an important role in cross-bridge cycling kinetics and cardiac muscle contraction. MLC-2v phosphorylation at Ser14 and Ser15 increases myosin lever arm stiffness and promotes myosin head diffusion, which altogether slow down myosin kinetics and prolong the duty cycle as a means to fine-tune myofilament Ca2+ sensitivity to force.

=== Effects on adult cardiac torsion, function and disease ===
A gradient in the levels of both MLC2v phosphorylation and its kinase, cardiac MLCK, has been shown to exist across the human heart from endocardium (low phosphorylation) to epicardium (high phosphorylation). The existence of this gradient has been proposed to impact cardiac torsion due to the relative spatial orientation of endocardial versus epicardial myofibers. In support of this, recent studies have shown that MLC-2v phosphorylation is critical in regulating left ventricular torsion. Variations in myosin cycling kinetics and contractile properties as a result of differential MLC-2v phosphorylation (Ser14/15) influence both epicardial and endocardial myofiber tension development and recovery to control cardiac torsion and myofiber strain mechanics.

A number of human studies have implicated loss of MLC-2v phosphorylation in the pathogenesis of human dilated cardiomyopathy and heart failure. MLC-2v dephosphorylation has also been reported in human patients carrying a rare form of familial hypertrophic cardiomyopathy (FHC) based on specific MLC-2v and MLCK mutations.

== Animal studies ==
MLC-2v plays a key role in the regulation of cardiac muscle contraction, through its interactions with myosin. Loss of MLC-2v in mice is associated with ultrastructural defects in sarcomere assembly and results in dilated cardiomyopathy and heart failure with reduced ejection fraction, leading to embryonic lethality at E12.5. More recently, a mutation in zebrafish tell tale heart (telm225) that encodes MLC-2, demonstrated that cardiac MLC-2 is required for thick filament stabilization and contractility in the embryonic zebrafish heart.

The role of Myl2 mutations in pathogenesis has been determined through the generation of a number of mouse models. Transgenic mice overexpressing the human MLC-2v R58Q mutation, which is associated with FHC has been shown to lead to a reduction in MLC-2v phosphorylation in hearts. These mice exhibited features of FHC, including diastolic dysfunction that progressed with age. Similarly, cardiac overexpression of another FHC-associated MLC-2v mutation (D166V) results in loss of MLC-2v phosphorylation in mouse hearts. In addition to these findings, MLC-2v dephosphorylation in mice results in cardiac dilatation and dysfunction associated with features reminiscent of dilated cardiomyopathy, leading to heart failure and premature death. Altogether these studies highlight a role for MLC-2v phosphorylation in adult heart function. These studies also suggest that torsion defects might be an early manifestation of dilated cardiomyopathy consequent to loss of MLC-2v phosphorylation. MLC-2v also plays an important role in cardiac stress associated with hypertrophy. In a novel MLC2v Ser14Ala/Ser15Ala knockin mouse model, complete loss of MLC2v (Ser14/Ser15) phosphorylation led to a worsened and differential (eccentric as opposed to concentric) response to pressure overload-induced hypertrophy. In addition, mice lacking cardiac MLCK display heart failure and experience premature death in response to both pressure overload and swimming induced hypertrophy. Consistent with these findings, a cardiac-specific transgenic mouse model overexpressing cardiac MLCK attenuated the response to cardiac hypertrophy induced by pressure overload. Furthermore, in a cardiac-specific transgenic mouse model overexpressing skeletal myosin light chain kinase, the response to cardiac hypertrophy induced by treadmill exercise or isoproterenol was also attenuated. These studies further highlight the therapeutic potential of increasing MLC-2v phosphorylation in settings of cardiac pathological stress.
