= Telokin =

Protein in humans

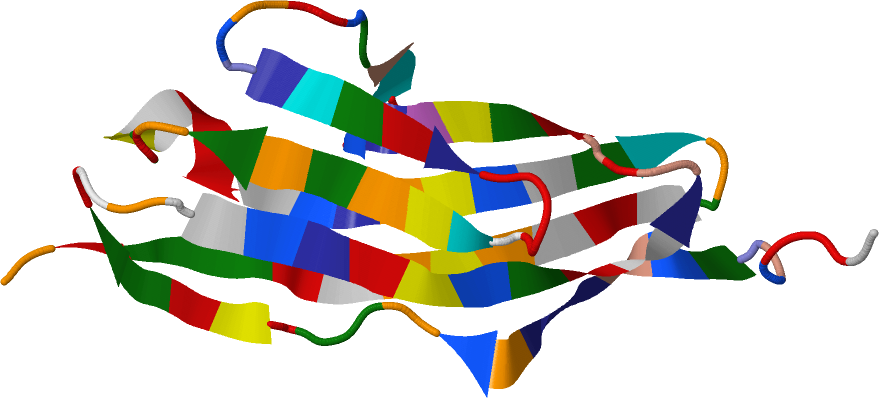
- Crystallographic structure of muscle myosin light chain kinase from turkey gizzard.

Identifiers
- Symbol: MYLK
- NCBI gene: 4638
- HGNC: 7590
- OMIM: 600922
- RefSeq: NM_053025
- UniProt: Q5MYA0

Other data
- EC number: 2.7.11.18
- Locus: Chr. 3 q21
Search for
- Structures: Swiss-model
- Domains: InterPro

Telokin (also known as kinase-related protein or KRP) is an abundant protein found in smooth-muscle. It is identical to the C-terminus of myosin light-chain kinase. Telokin may play a role in the stabilization of unphosphorylated smooth-muscle myosin filaments. Because of its origin as the C-terminal end of smooth muscle myosin light chain kinase, it is called "telokin" (from a combination of the Greek telos, "end" and kinase).

== Nomenclature and classification ==
Telokin's systematic name is ATP:[myosin light chain] O-phosphotransferase and its recommended name is myosin-light-chain kinase. (EC 2.7.11.18).

The gene MYLK, a muscle member of the immunoglobulin gene superfamily, encodes myosin light chain kinase which is a calcium/calmodulin dependent enzyme. Four transcript variants that produce four isoforms of the calcium/calmodulin dependent enzyme have been identified as well as two transcripts that produce two isoforms of telokin. The two transcripts that produce the two telokin isoforms are the following:

Isoform 7
This variant encodes the shorter isoform of kinase related protein, telokin. The first exon corresponds to intron 30 and the remainder of the transcript corresponds to the last two exons of the gene. It is shorter than variant 8 by one codon at the splicing junction between the first two exons. It is made by 153 aa. NCBI Reference Sequence: NP_444259.1. It comes from the Homo sapiens myosin light chain kinase (MYLK), transcript variant 7, mRNA, whose length is 2676 bp. NCBI Reference Sequence: NM_053031.2.
Isoform 8
This variant encodes the longer isoform of kinase related protein, telokin. It is longer than variant 7 by one codon at the splicing junction between the first two exons. It is composed of 154 aa. NCBI Reference Sequence: NP_444260.1. It comes from the Homo sapiens myosin light chain kinase (MYLK), transcript variant 8, mRNA, whose length is 2679 bp. NCBI Reference Sequence: NM_053032.2.

== Catalytic activity and other functional data ==
Telokin catalyzes the following reaction:

- ATP + myosin-light-chain = ADP + myosin-light-chain phosphate. (Reaction type: phospho group transfer)

It requires Ca^{2+} and calmodulin for activity. The 20-kDa light chain from smooth muscle myosin is phosphorylated more rapidly than any other acceptor, but light chains from other myosins and myosin itself can act as acceptors, but more slowly.

The K_{m} values of homo sapiens telokin is 0.018 mM at 23–25 °C and pH = 7.5. This enzyme has a pH optimum of 7.4 and temperature optimum of 30 °C.

Telokin is an acidic protein with a PI value of 4-5 and 17-kDa with an amino acid sequence that is identical to the C terminus of the 130-kDa myosin light chain kinase (MLCK), although it is expressed as a separate protein and produced by an alternate promoter of the MLCK gene. Telokin is transcribed from a second promoter, located within an intron, in the 3' region of the MLCK gene. And that is why the concentration of telokin (at least 15 μM) is higher than MLCK concentration.

Telokin has been shown to bind to unphosphorylated myosin filaments and to stimulate myosin mini-filament assembly in vitro. The major mechanism for initiating smooth muscle (SM)2 contraction is the rise in Ca^{2+} concentration resulting in an increase in 20-kDa myosin regulatory light chain (MLC20) phosphorylation at Ser-19.

== Structure ==
Primary structure
Telokin is an intracellular protein and, as such, does not contain the disulfide linkage between beta-strands B and F normally observed in the immunoglobulin constant domains. It does, however, contain two cysteine amino acid residues (Cys63 and Cys115) that are situated at structurally identical positions to those forming the disulfide linkage in the immunoglobulin constant domain.
Secondary structure
Telokin contains 154 amino acid residues, 103 of which were visible in the electron density map. Telokin and the C-terminal domain of MLCK show amino acid sequence similarity to several quite unrelated muscle proteins such as titin or C-protein. The overall molecular fold of telokin consists of seven strands of antiparallel beta-pleated sheet that wrap around to form a barrel. There is also an extended tail of eight amino acid residues at the N terminus that does not participate in beta-sheet formation. The beta-barrel can be simply envisioned as two layers of beta-sheet, nearly parallel to one another, with one layer containing four and the other three beta-strands.
Domains
Telokin has a particular domain called Ig-like I-type (Immunoglobulin like intermediate type) with a length of 92 residues between 42 and 133. At the beginning it was thought that this domain was Ig- like C2-type but some studies determined that its structure shares characteristics from V-set and C2-set and that is why the a I-type was invented. These kind of domains mediates T-cell adhesion via its ectodomain, and signal transduction.

== Tissue distribution ==
KRP presence in different tissues has been assessed by immunoblots using anti-KRP antibodies, and by analyses of its mRNA in Northern blot. KRP is an abundant smooth muscles-specific protein. So far it has not been detected in non-muscle tissues and striated muscles. Its concentration in gizzard muscle is lo-12-fold higher than that of MLCK and only 2-3-fold less than that of myosin. Vascular muscles have a lower KRP/MLCK ratio.

Telokin is expressed at very high levels in intestinal, urinary, and reproductive tract smooth muscle, at lower levels in vascular smooth muscle, and at undetectable levels in skeletal or cardiac muscle or nonmuscle tissues. Although telokin is strongly activated by myocardin and myocardin is highly expressed in vascular smooth muscle cells, there is relatively little expression of telokin in these cells. This suggests that an inhibitory factor must be attenuating the activity of the telokin promoter in vascular smooth muscle cells. One possible candidate for this inhibitory factor is GATA-6

The increase in telokin expression correlated with an increase in the expression of several other smooth muscle-restricted proteins, including smooth muscle myosin and alpha-actin.

Accumulates in individuals with asthma (at protein levels). Induced by tumor necrosis factor (TNF). Repressed by androgens (e.g. R1881).

== Function ==
Telokin have two related functions in the C-terminal myosin-binding domain of smooth muscle myosin light chain kinase (MLCK). First, telokin stabilizes myosin filaments in the presence of ATP. Second, telokin can modulate the level of myosin light chain phosphorylation. In this latter role, multiple mechanisms have been suggested. One hypothesis is that light chain phosphorylation is diminished by the direct competition of KRP and MLCK for myosin, resulting in a loss of contraction.

Telokin also inhibits the phosphorylation of myosin filaments while having no effect on phosphorylation of the isolated smooth-muscle myosin regulatory light chain (ReLC). However, when telokin was phosphorylated by MLCK, the telokin-induced inhibition of myosin phosphorylation was removed, which indicates the existence of a telokin-dependent modulatory pathway in smooth-muscle regulation. In this part we must say that the phosphorylation of telokin can be enhanced by the concentration of Ca^{2+} and calmodulin.

Kinase-related protein (telokin) binds to dephosphorylated smooth myosin near the junction between the rod and the catalytic head region (S-I). This interaction is prevented by MLCK-catalysed phosphorylation of myosin and conversely, the rate of myosin phosphorylation is in turn inhibited by KRP in vitro. As a consequence of this, in vivo KRP might slow down the rate of myosin phosphorylation by myosin light chain kinase (MLCK) and, therefore, tension development. When the intracellular Ca2+ level is decreasing, the KRP can also accelerate muscle relaxation by lowering the ratio of phosphorylated to phosphorylated myosin. KRP is also an important structural regulator of myosin filaments. Smooth muscle myosin, under physiological conditions in vitro, can adapt two relatively and different stable conformations. When the myosin is in the extended conformation, it is active and able to combine with other myosin molecules to form thick filaments which are fundamental for effective contraction. Upon ATP binding, the rod part of unphosphorylated myosin molecule folds into thirds, so that the head –rod junction is brought close to the middle of the rod and stabilized there, presumable by interacting with both the 20 KDa light chains and the neck region. This interaction is prevented by the MLCK-dependent light chain phosphorylation, resulting in the unfolding of myosin monomers and their rapid polymerization into filaments.

The binding of KRP to the neck region folded, ATP-bound dephosphorylated myosin also promotes unfolding and filament formation, thus looking like light chain phosphorylation. This could be a physiologically significant phenomenon considering the high concentration of ATP always present in smooth muscle cells. Thus, Kinase-related protein may have a very important role in relaxed smooth muscle by keeping dephosphorylated myosin in the filamentous state ready for the next rapid contractile response. Experiments aimed at testing this hypothesis indicated that under appropriate conditions a small excess of KRP is enough to form an equimolar complex with smooth muscle myosin and to cause its complete polymerization in the presence of ATP. Experiments where it has been tested this hypothesis, indicated that in appropriated conditions, a small excess of KRP is enough to form an equimolar complex with smooth muscle myosin and in the presence of ATP, cause its complete polymerization.

== Pathology ==
Certain mutations in the MYLK gene are associated with thoracic aortic aneurysms or thoracic aortic dissections. This disease is caused by mutations affecting the gene MYLK. A disease characterized by permanent dilation of the thoracic aorta usually due to degenerative changes in the aortic wall. It is primarily associated with a characteristic histologic appearance known as 'medial necrosis' or 'Erdheim cystic medial necrosis' in which there is degeneration and fragmentation of elastic fibers, loss of smooth muscle cells, and an accumulation of basophilic ground substance.

== The effect of hypoxia ==
In cats, telokin expression varies inversely with artery diameter except for cerebral arteries where no telokin is observed. Telokin and myosin light chain are distributed uniformly throughout small pulmonary arteries however they do not colocalized. During hypoxia, telokin dephosphorylates, and myosin light chain becomes increasingly phosphorylated in small pulmonary arteries smooth muscle cell, whereas in large pulmonary arteries smooth muscle cell there is no change in either telokin or myosin light chain phosphorylation. When large pulmonary arteries smooth muscle cell were exposed to phenylephrine, myosin light chain phosphorylation increased with no change in telokin phosphorylation. In small pulmonary arteries, phosphorylated telokin may help maintain relaxation under unstimulated conditions, whereas in large pulmonary arteries, telokin's function remains undetermined.
