= MYL3 =

Protein-coding gene in the species Homo sapiens

Identifiers
- Aliases: MYL3, CMH8, MLC1SB, MLC1V, VLC1, MLC-lV/sb, VLCl, myosin light chain 3
- External IDs: OMIM: 160790; MGI: 97268; GeneCards: MYL3

Gene location (Human)
Chr.	Chromosome 3 (human)
Band	3p21.31	Start	46,835,111 bp
Band	3p21.31	End	46,882,172 bp

Gene location (Mouse)
Chr.	Chromosome 9 (mouse)
Band	9 F2|9 60.69 cM	Start	110,570,929 bp
Band	9 F2|9 60.69 cM	End	110,598,866 bp
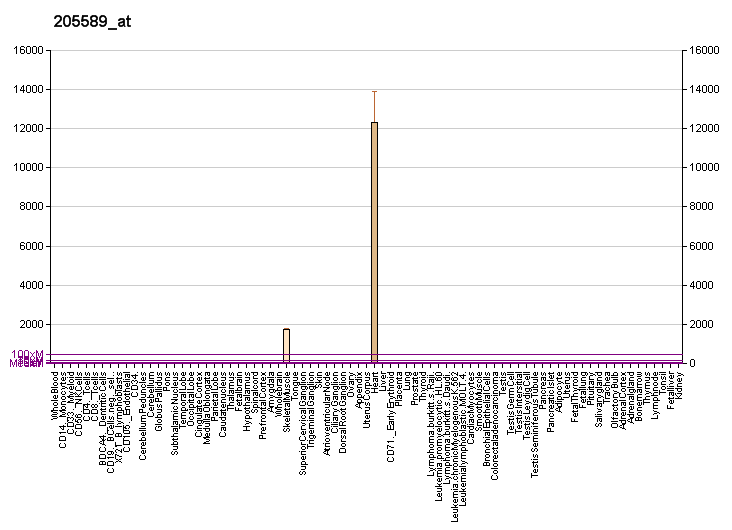
RNA expression pattern
Bgee	Human / Mouse (ortholog); Top expressed in: apex of heart; right ventricle; muscle of thigh; myocardium of left ventricle; triceps brachii muscle; Skeletal muscle tissue of biceps brachii; thoracic diaphragm; vastus lateralis muscle; Skeletal muscle tissue of rectus abdominis; glutes / Top expressed in: interventricular septum; myocardium of ventricle; cardiac muscles; atrioventricular valve; soleus muscle; cardiac muscle tissue of left ventricle; endocardial cushion; right ventricle; plantaris muscle; esophagus; More reference expression data
BioGPS	More reference expression data
Gene ontology
Molecular function	calcium ion binding; structural constituent of muscle; cytoskeletal motor activity; actin monomer binding; myosin II heavy chain binding
Cellular component	cytosol; muscle myosin complex; sarcomere; A band; I band; myosin complex
Biological process	ventricular cardiac muscle tissue morphogenesis; regulation of striated muscle contraction; skeletal muscle tissue development; positive regulation of ATP-dependent activity; cardiac muscle contraction; regulation of the force of heart contraction; muscle filament sliding
Sources:Amigo / QuickGO
Orthologs
Databases	NCBI: entry; OMA: entry
Species	Human	Mouse
Entrez	4634	17897
Ensembl	ENSG00000160808	ENSMUSG00000059741
UniProt	P08590	P09542
RefSeq (mRNA)	NM_000258	NM_010859; NM_001364484
RefSeq (protein)	NP_000249; NP_000249.1	NP_034989; NP_001351413
Location (UCSC)	Chr 3: 46.84 – 46.88 Mb	Chr 9: 110.57 – 110.6 Mb
PubMed search
- Wikidata
View/Edit Human	View/Edit Mouse

Myosin essential light chain (ELC), ventricular/cardiac isoform is a protein that in humans is encoded by the MYL3 gene. This cardiac ventricular/slow skeletal ELC isoform is distinct from that expressed in fast skeletal muscle (MYL1) and cardiac atrial muscle (MYL4). Ventricular ELC is part of the myosin molecule and is important in modulating cardiac muscle contraction.

== Structure ==
Cardiac, ventricular ELC is 21.9 kDa and composed of 195 amino acids (See human MYL3 sequences features here). Cardiac ELC and the second light chain, regulatory light chain (RLC, MYL2), are non-covalently bound to IQXXXRGXXXR motifs in the 9 nm S1-S2 lever arm of the myosin head, both alpha (MYH6) and beta (MYH7) isoforms. Both light chains are members of the EF-hand superfamily of proteins, which possess helix-loop-helix motifs in two globular domains connected by an alpha-helical linker. Though EF hand motifs are specialized to bind divalent ions such as calcium, cardiac ELC does not bind calcium at physiological levels. The N-terminal region of cardiac ELC is functionally unique in that it is positively charged, being rich in lysine residues (amino acids 4-14), with subsequent unique structure governed by proline-alanine repeats (amino acids 15-36).

== Function ==
Studies have provided evidence for ELC as modulator of myosin crossbridge kinetics. Treating cardiac myofibrils with the lysine-rich N-terminal peptide (amino acids 5-14) evoked a supramaximal increase in cardiac myofibrillar MgATPase activity at submaximal calcium concentrations, and further studies demonstrated that this region of ELC modulates the affinity of myosin for actin.

== Clinical significance ==
Mutations in MYL3 have been identified as a cause of familial hypertrophic cardiomyopathy, and associated with a mid-left ventricular chamber type hypertrophy. Five mutations in MYL3 have been identified to date: M149V, R154H, E56G, A57G and E143K. All of these cluster around two of the four EF-hand domains, suggesting that proper conformation in these regions is necessary for normal cardiac function.
