= Myosin regulatory light chain 12A =

Protein found in humans

MYL12A

Identifiers
- Aliases: MYL12A, HEL-S-24, MLCB, MRCL3, MRLC3, MYL2B, MLC-2B, myosin light chain 12A
- External IDs: MGI: 107494; GeneCards: MYL12A

Gene location (Human)
Chr.	Chromosome 18 (human)
Band	18p11.31	Start	3,247,481 bp
Band	18p11.31	End	3,256,236 bp

Gene location (Mouse)
Chr.	Chromosome 17 (mouse)
Band	17|17 E1.3	Start	71,280,128 bp
Band	17|17 E1.3	End	71,297,885 bp
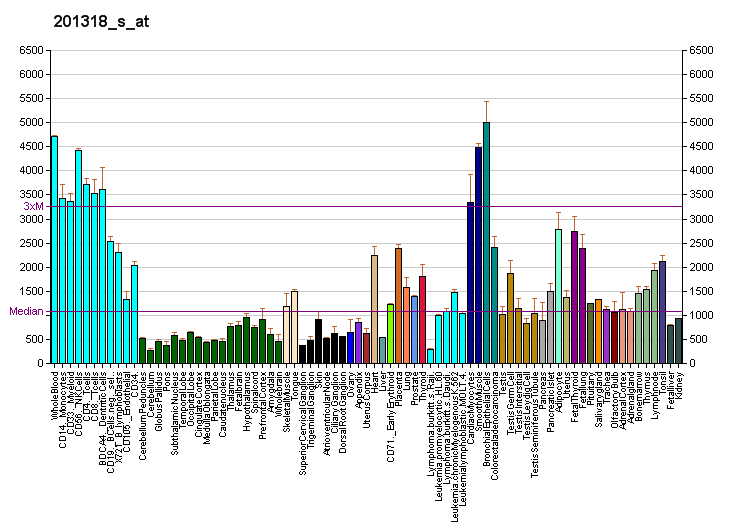
RNA expression pattern
Bgee	Human / Mouse (ortholog); Top expressed in: apex of heart; muscle of thigh; right auricle of heart; monocyte; right lung; granulocyte; upper lobe of left lung; right coronary artery; ascending aorta; left coronary artery / Top expressed in: granulocyte; primary visual cortex; superior frontal gyrus; yolk sac; lip; right kidney; dentate gyrus of hippocampal formation granule cell; ventricular zone; embryo; blastocyst; More reference expression data
BioGPS	More reference expression data
Gene ontology
Molecular function	calcium ion binding; protein binding; metal ion binding; myosin heavy chain binding
Cellular component	cytosol; extracellular exosome; myosin complex; myosin II complex; apical part of cell; Z discdkac; brush border; stress fiber; cell cortex region
Biological process	ephrin receptor signaling pathway; muscle contraction; platelet aggregation; regulation of cell shape
Sources:Amigo / QuickGO
Orthologs
Databases	NCBI: entry; OMA: entry
Species	Human	Mouse
Entrez	10627	67938
Ensembl	ENSG00000101608	ENSMUSG00000034868
UniProt	P19105; O14950	Q3THE2
RefSeq (mRNA)	NM_001303047; NM_001303048; NM_001303049; NM_006471	NM_023402
RefSeq (protein)	NP_001289976; NP_001289977; NP_001289978; NP_006462; NP_001138416 NP_001138417; NP_291024; NP_001289976; NP_001289977; NP_001289978; NP_006462	NP_075891
Location (UCSC)	Chr 18: 3.25 – 3.26 Mb	Chr 17: 71.28 – 71.3 Mb
PubMed search
- Wikidata
View/Edit Human	View/Edit Mouse

Myosin regulatory light chain 12A is a protein that in humans is encoded by the MYL12A gene. This regulatory protein is involved in the regulation of smooth and non-muscle cell contraction, and is activated by phosphorylation.

== See also ==
- Myosin light chain
- Myosin regulatory light chain 12B
