= MYL6B =

Protein-coding gene in the species Homo sapiens

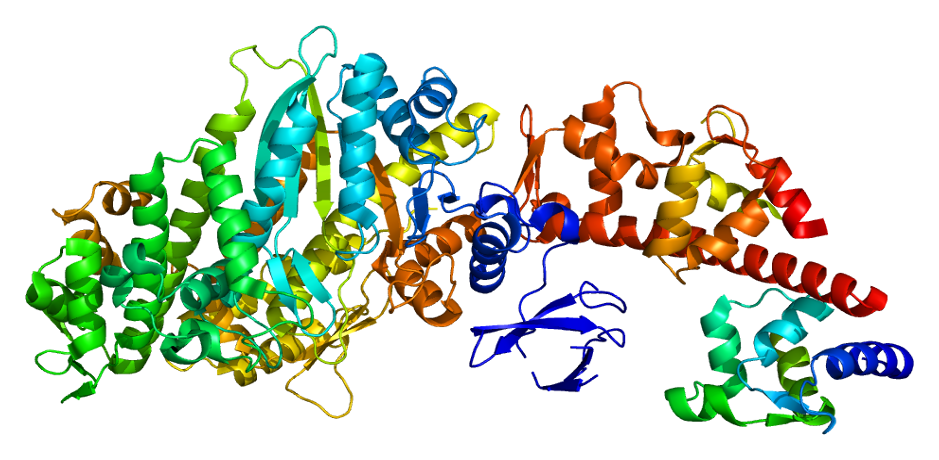

Identifiers
- Aliases: MYL6B, MLC1SA, myosin light chain 6B
- External IDs: OMIM: 609930; MGI: 1917789; GeneCards: MYL6B
Available structures
PDB	Ortholog search: PDBe RCSB
PDB	List of PDB id codes 1OE9, 1W7I, 1W7J

Gene location (Human)
Chr.	Chromosome 12 (human)
Band	12q13.2	Start	56,152,256 bp
Band	12q13.2	End	56,159,647 bp

Gene location (Mouse)
Chr.	Chromosome 10 (mouse)
Band	10|10 D3	Start	128,330,026 bp
Band	10|10 D3	End	128,334,554 bp
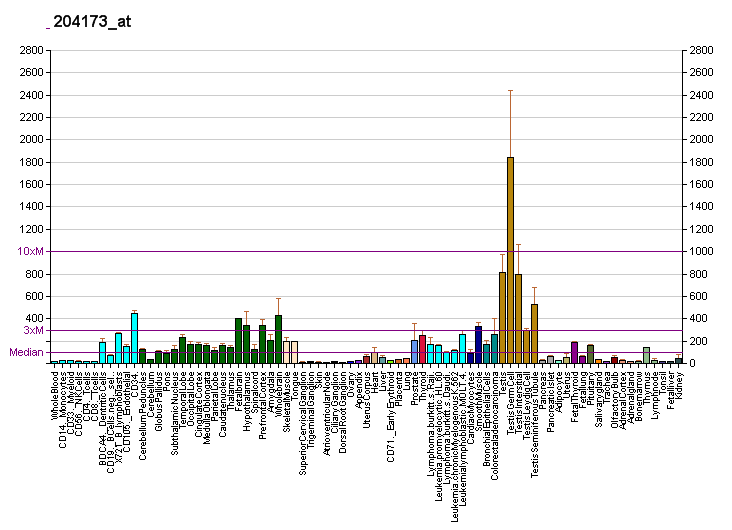
RNA expression pattern
Bgee	Human / Mouse (ortholog); Top expressed in: glutes; Skeletal muscle tissue of biceps brachii; muscle of thigh; thoracic diaphragm; ganglionic eminence; tibialis anterior muscle; epithelium of colon; deltoid muscle; left testis; right testis / Top expressed in: thoracic diaphragm; hypothalamus; genital tubercle; white adipose tissue; testicle; ganglionic eminence; tail of embryo; synovial joint; ankle joint; muscle tissue; More reference expression data
BioGPS	More reference expression data
Gene ontology
Molecular function	calcium ion binding; structural constituent of muscle; cytoskeletal motor activity; protein binding
Cellular component	cytosol; muscle myosin complex; unconventional myosin complex; extracellular exosome; myosin complex
Biological process	muscle contraction; skeletal muscle tissue development; muscle filament sliding
Sources:Amigo / QuickGO
Orthologs
Databases	NCBI: entry; OMA: entry
Species	Human	Mouse
Entrez	140465	216459
Ensembl	ENSG00000196465	ENSMUSG00000039824
UniProt	P14649	Q8CI43
RefSeq (mRNA)	NM_002475; NM_001199629	NM_172259
RefSeq (protein)	NP_001186558; NP_002466	NP_758463
Location (UCSC)	Chr 12: 56.15 – 56.16 Mb	Chr 10: 128.33 – 128.33 Mb
PubMed search
- Wikidata
View/Edit Human	View/Edit Mouse

Myosin light chain 6B is a protein that in humans is encoded by the MYL6B gene. Myosin is a hexameric ATPase cellular motor protein. It is composed of two heavy chains, two nonphosphorylatable alkali light chains, and two phosphorylatable regulatory light chains. This gene encodes a myosin alkali light chain expressed in both slow-twitch skeletal muscle and in nonmuscle tissue.
