= MYLK4 =

Enzyme in humans

Identifiers
- Aliases: MYLK4, SgK085, myosin light chain kinase family member 4
- External IDs: MGI: 3643758; GeneCards: MYLK4
Available structures
PDB	Ortholog search: PDBe RCSB
PDB	List of PDB id codes 2X4F
Enzyme activity
EC #	BRENDA	ExPASy	KEGG	MetaCyc
2.7.11.1	↗	↗	↗	↗

Gene location (Human)
Chr.	Chromosome 6 (human)
Band	6p25.2	Start	2,663,629 bp
Band	6p25.2	End	2,750,922 bp

Gene location (Mouse)
Chr.	Chromosome 13 (mouse)
Band	13|13 A3.2	Start	32,884,810 bp
Band	13|13 A3.2	End	32,967,937 bp
RNA expression pattern
Bgee	Human / Mouse (ortholog); Top expressed in: biceps brachii; deltoid muscle; Skeletal muscle tissue of biceps brachii; buccal mucosa cell; Skeletal muscle tissue of rectus abdominis; body of tongue; muscle of thigh; quadriceps femoris muscle; vastus lateralis muscle; gastrocnemius muscle / Top expressed in: muscle of thigh; knee joint; triceps brachii muscle; vastus lateralis muscle; skeletal muscle tissue; interventricular septum; gastrocnemius muscle; temporal muscle; extraocular muscle; medial head of gastrocnemius muscle; More reference expression data
BioGPS	n/a
Gene ontology
Molecular function	transferase activity; nucleotide binding; protein kinase activity; protein serine/threonine kinase activity; ATP binding; kinase activity; myosin light chain kinase activity
Cellular component	intracellular anatomical structure
Biological process	protein phosphorylation; phosphorylation; peptidyl-serine phosphorylation; peptidyl-threonine phosphorylation; intracellular signal transduction
Sources:Amigo / QuickGO
Orthologs
Databases	NCBI: entry; OMA: entry
Species	Human	Mouse
Entrez	340156	238564
Ensembl	ENSG00000145949	ENSMUSG00000044951
UniProt	Q86YV6	Q5SUV5
RefSeq (mRNA)	NM_001012418; NM_001347872	NM_001166030; NM_001368880
RefSeq (protein)	NP_001012418; NP_001334801	NP_001159502
Location (UCSC)	Chr 6: 2.66 – 2.75 Mb	Chr 13: 32.88 – 32.97 Mb
PubMed search
- Wikidata
View/Edit Human	View/Edit Mouse

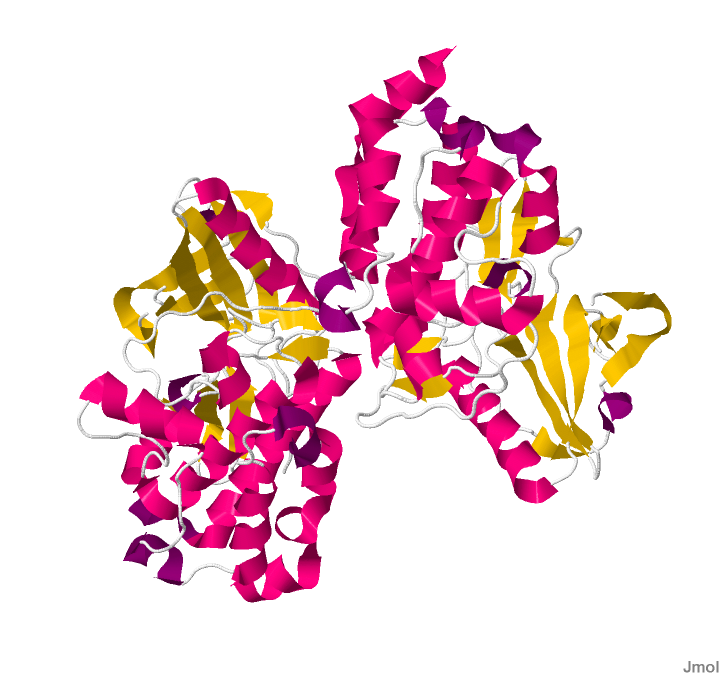
The crystal structure of the human myosin light chain kinase Loc340156.

Myosin light chain kinase 4 also known as MYLK4 is an enzyme which in humans is encoded by the MYLK4 gene. MYLK4 is a member of the myosin light-chain kinase family of serine/threonine-specific protein kinases that phosphorylate the regulatory light chain of myosin II.

This protein acts as an enzyme that catalyzes the following reaction: ATP + a protein -> ADP + a phosphoprotein.

MYLK4 is also involved in protein amino acid phosphorylation meaning that it adds a phosphate group onto the molecule.

Not very much is known about the specific functional characteristics of MLYK4, but it has recently been found that the gene may possibly have a role in having at least one driver mutation for cancer. MYLK4 may also be involved in transferase activity, ATP binding, protein serine/threonine kinase activity, and also nucleotide binding. Other names for MYLK4 are CaMLCK like; EG238564; MYLK4; Mylk4; Myosin light chain kinase family, member 4; SgK085; SGK085; Sgk085; Sugen kinase 85; Uncharacterized serine/threonine-protein kinase SgK085.

There are other known myosin light-chain kinase enzymes.
