= Myosin light chain 5 =

Protein-coding gene in the species Homo sapiens

MYL5

Identifiers
- Aliases: MYL5, myosin light chain 5, MYLC2
- External IDs: OMIM: 160782; GeneCards: MYL5

Gene location (Human)
Chr.	Chromosome 4 (human)
Band	4p16.3	Start	673,580 bp
Band	4p16.3	End	682,033 bp
RNA expression pattern
Bgee	Human / Mouse (ortholog); Top expressed in: mucosa of transverse colon; skin of abdomen; right adrenal cortex; left adrenal cortex; left testis; right testis; right hemisphere of cerebellum; skin of leg; apex of heart; sural nerve / n/a; More reference expression data
BioGPS	n/a
Gene ontology
Molecular function	calcium ion binding; structural constituent of muscle; metal ion binding
Cellular component	cytosol; muscle myosin complex; myosin complex
Biological process	regulation of muscle contraction; muscle contraction
Sources:Amigo / QuickGO
Orthologs
Databases	NCBI: entry; OMA: entry
Species	Human	Mouse
Entrez	4636	n/a
Ensembl	ENSG00000215375	n/a
UniProt	Q02045	n/a
RefSeq (mRNA)	NM_002477; NM_001363650	n/a
RefSeq (protein)	NP_002468; NP_001350579	n/a
Location (UCSC)	Chr 4: 0.67 – 0.68 Mb	n/a
PubMed search		n/a
- Wikidata
View/Edit Human

Myosin light chain 5 is a protein that, in humans, is encoded by the MYL5 gene.

== Function ==
This gene encodes one of the myosin light chains, a component of the hexameric ATPase cellular motor protein myosin. Myosin is composed of two heavy chains, two nonphosphorylatable alkali light chains, and two phosphorylatable regulatory light chains. This gene product, one of the regulatory light chains, is expressed in fetal muscle and in adult retina, cerebellum, and basal ganglia.
