= MYLK3 =

Protein-coding gene in the species Homo sapiens

Identifiers
- Aliases: MYLK3, MLCK, MLCK2, caMLCK, myosin light chain kinase 3
- External IDs: OMIM: 612147; MGI: 2443063; GeneCards: MYLK3
Enzyme activity
EC #	BRENDA	ExPASy	KEGG	MetaCyc
2.7.11.18	↗	↗	↗	↗

Gene location (Human)
Chr.	Chromosome 16 (human)
Band	16q11.2	Start	46,702,282 bp
Band	16q11.2	End	46,790,407 bp

Gene location (Mouse)
Chr.	Chromosome 8 (mouse)
Band	8|8 C3	Start	86,050,932 bp
Band	8|8 C3	End	86,112,974 bp
RNA expression pattern
Bgee	Human / Mouse (ortholog); Top expressed in: cardiac muscle tissue of right atrium; right ventricle; myocardium of left ventricle; right auricle of heart; Skeletal muscle tissue of biceps brachii; body of tongue; apex of heart; thoracic diaphragm; Skeletal muscle tissue of rectus abdominis; triceps brachii muscle / Top expressed in: myocardium of ventricle; atrium; interventricular septum; atrioventricular valve; epithelium of small intestine; esophagus; migratory enteric neural crest cell; endocardial cushion; left ventricle; bone marrow; More reference expression data
BioGPS	n/a
Gene ontology
Molecular function	calmodulin-dependent protein kinase activity; kinase activity; nucleotide binding; protein kinase activity; protein serine/threonine kinase activity; transferase activity; ATP binding; myosin light chain kinase activity
Cellular component	cytoplasm; actin cytoskeleton; cytosol; intracellular anatomical structure
Biological process	protein phosphorylation; positive regulation of sarcomere organization; regulation of vascular permeability involved in acute inflammatory response; sarcomere organization; cellular response to interleukin-1; phosphorylation; peptidyl-serine phosphorylation; peptidyl-threonine phosphorylation; intracellular signal transduction; sarcomerogenesis; cardiac myofibril assembly
Sources:Amigo / QuickGO
Orthologs
Databases	NCBI: entry; OMA: entry
Species	Human	Mouse
Entrez	91807	213435
Ensembl	ENSG00000140795	ENSMUSG00000031698
UniProt	Q32MK0	Q3UIZ8
RefSeq (mRNA)	NM_001308301; NM_182493	NM_001297612; NM_175441
RefSeq (protein)	NP_001295230; NP_872299	NP_001284541; NP_780650
Location (UCSC)	Chr 16: 46.7 – 46.79 Mb	Chr 8: 86.05 – 86.11 Mb
PubMed search
- Wikidata
View/Edit Human	View/Edit Mouse

Myosin light chain kinase 3 also known as MYLK3, is an enzyme which in humans is encoded by the MYLK3 gene.

== Function ==
Phosphorylation of cardiac myosin heavy chains (see MYH7B) and light chains (see MYL2) by a kinase, such as MYLK3, potentiates the force and rate of cross-bridge recruitment in cardiac myocytes.

== See also ==
- Myosin light-chain kinase
