= MYL4 =

Protein-coding gene in the species Homo sapiens

Identifiers
- Aliases: MYL4, ALC1, AMLC, GT1, PRO1957, myosin light chain 4
- External IDs: OMIM: 160770; MGI: 97267; GeneCards: MYL4

Gene location (Human)
Chr.	Chromosome 17 (human)
Band	17q21.32	Start	47,200,446 bp
Band	17q21.32	End	47,223,679 bp

Gene location (Mouse)
Chr.	Chromosome 11 (mouse)
Band	11 E1|11 67.79 cM	Start	104,550,663 bp
Band	11 E1|11 67.79 cM	End	104,595,753 bp
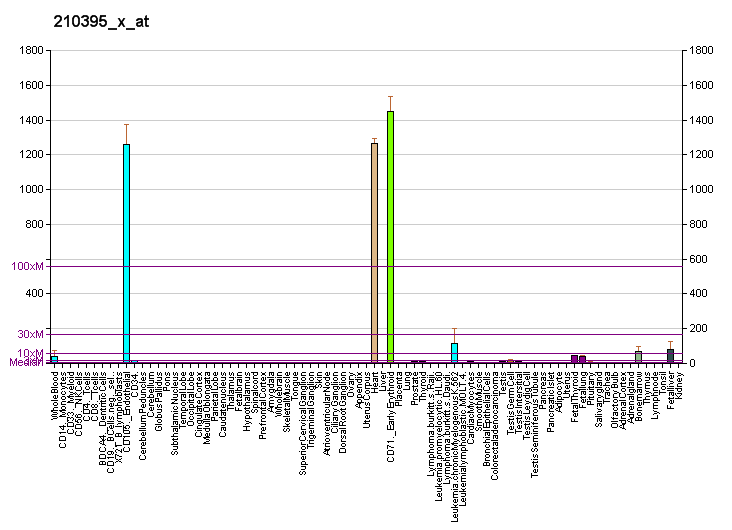

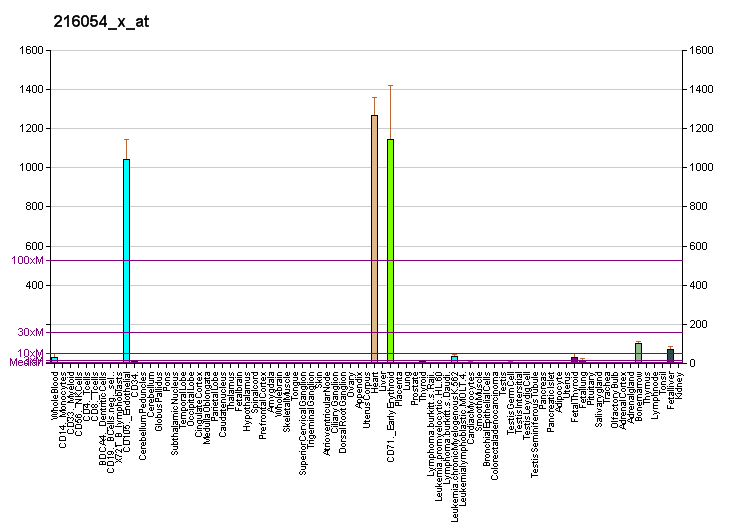

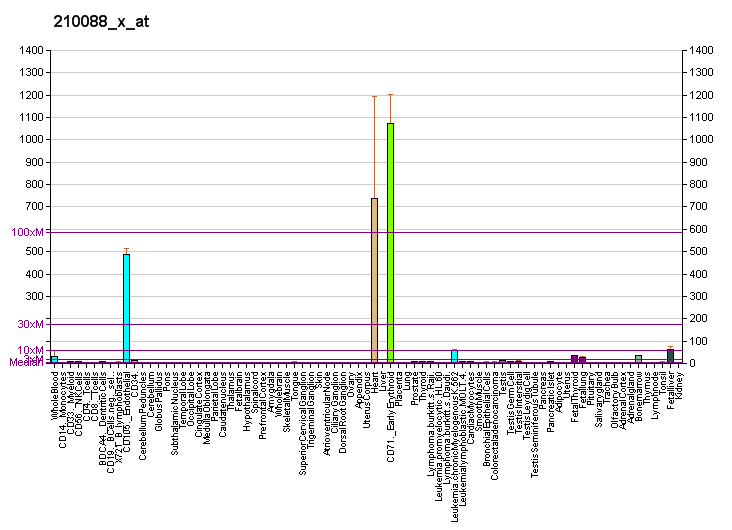
RNA expression pattern
Bgee	Human / Mouse (ortholog); Top expressed in: right auricle of heart; cardiac muscle tissue of right atrium; apex of heart; vena cava; right ventricle; testicle; trabecular bone; left ventricle; blood; bone marrow / Top expressed in: atrium; endocardial cushion; atrioventricular valve; aortic valve; internal carotid artery; human fetus; interventricular septum; right lung; right lung lobe; fossa; More reference expression data
BioGPS	More reference expression data
Gene ontology
Molecular function	calcium ion binding; actin filament binding; actin monomer binding; myosin II heavy chain binding
Cellular component	cytosol; A band; myosin complex
Biological process	positive regulation of ATP-dependent activity; cardiac muscle contraction; regulation of the force of heart contraction; muscle filament sliding
Sources:Amigo / QuickGO
Orthologs
Databases	NCBI: entry; OMA: entry
Species	Human	Mouse
Entrez	4635	17896
Ensembl	ENSG00000198336	ENSMUSG00000061086
UniProt	P12829	P09541
RefSeq (mRNA)	NM_001002841; NM_002476	NM_010858; NM_001355754; NM_001355755
RefSeq (protein)	NP_001002841; NP_002467	n/a
Location (UCSC)	Chr 17: 47.2 – 47.22 Mb	Chr 11: 104.55 – 104.6 Mb
PubMed search
- Wikidata
View/Edit Human	View/Edit Mouse

Atrial Light Chain-1 (ALC-1), also known as Essential Light Chain, Atrial is a protein that in humans is encoded by the MYL4 gene. ALC-1 is expressed in fetal cardiac ventricular and fetal skeletal muscle, as well as fetal and adult cardiac atrial tissue. ALC-1 expression is reactivated in human ventricular myocardium in various cardiac muscle diseases, including hypertrophic cardiomyopathy, dilated cardiomyopathy, ischemic cardiomyopathy and congenital heart diseases.

== Structure ==
ALC-1 is a 21.6 kDa protein composed of 197 amino acids. ALC-1 is expressed in fetal cardiac ventricular and fetal skeletal muscle, as well as fetal and adult cardiac atrial tissue. ALC-1 binds the neck region of muscle myosin in adult atria. Two alternatively spliced transcript variants encoding the same protein have been found for this gene. Relative to ventricular essential light chain VLC-1, ALC-1 has an additional ~40 amino-acid N-terminal region that contains four to eleven residues that are critical for binding actin and modulating myosin kinetics.

== Function ==
ALC-1 is expressed very early in skeletal muscle and cardiac muscle development; two E-boxes and CArG box in the MYL4 promoter region regulate transcription. ALC-1 expression in cardiac ventricles decreases in early postnatal development, but is highly expressed in atria throughout all of adulthood. Normal atrial function is essential for embryogenesis, as inactivation of the MYL7 gene was embryonic lethal at ED10.5-11.5.

Evidence of ALC-1 isoform expression on contractile mechanics of sarcomeres came from experiments studying fibers from patients expressing a higher level of ALC-1 relative to VLC-1 in cardiac left ventricular tissue. Fibers expressing high ALC-1 exhibited a higher maximal velocity and rate of shortening compared to fibers with low amounts of ALC-1, suggesting that ALC-1 increases cycling kinetics of myosin cross-bridges and regulates cardiac contractility. Further biochemical studies unveiled a weaker binding of the Alanine-Proline-rich N-terminus of ALC-1 to the C-terminus of actin relative to VLC-1, which may explain the mechanism underlying the differences in cycling kinetics. The importance of this region has however raised skepticism. Further evidence for the contractile-enhancing properties of ALC-1 came from studies employing transgenesis to replace VLC-1 with ALC-1 in the mouse ventricle. This study demonstrated an increase in unloaded shortening velocity, both in skinned fibers and in an in vitro motility assay, as well as enhanced contractility and relaxation in whole heart experiments. These studies were supported by further studies in transgenic rats overexpressing ALC-1 which showed enhanced rates of contraction and relaxation, as well as left ventricular developed pressure in Langendorff heart preparations. Importantly, overexpression of ALC-1 was shown to attenuate heart failure in pressure-overloaded animals, by enhancing left ventricular developed pressure, maximal velocity of pressure development and relaxation.

== Clinical significance ==
MYL4 expression in ventricular myocardium has shown to abnormally persist in neonates up through adulthood in patients with the congenital heart disease, tetralogy of Fallot. Altered ALC-1 expression is also altered in other congenital heart diseases, Double outlet right ventricle and infundibular pulmonary stenosis. Moreover, in patients with aortic stenosis or aortic insufficiency, ALC-1 expression in left ventricles was elevated, and following valve replacement decreased to lower levels; ALC-1 expression also correlated with left ventricular systolic pressure.

Additionally, in patients with ischemic cardiomyopathy, dilated cardiomyopathy and hypertrophic cardiomyopathy, ALC-1 protein expression is shown to be reactivated, and ALC-1 expression correlates with calcium sensitivity of myofilament proteins in skinned fiber preparations, as well as ventricular dP/dtmax and ejection fraction.

== Interactions ==
ALC-1 interacts with:

- ACTC1
- MYH7
