= MYLK2 =

Protein-coding gene in the species Homo sapiens

Identifiers
- Aliases: MYLK2, KMLC, MLCK, MLCK2, skMLCK, myosin light chain kinase 2
- External IDs: OMIM: 606566; MGI: 2139434; GeneCards: MYLK2
Available structures
PDB	Ortholog search: PDBe RCSB
PDB	List of PDB id codes 2LV6, 3KF9
Enzyme activity
EC #	BRENDA	ExPASy	KEGG	MetaCyc
2.7.11.18	↗	↗	↗	↗

Gene location (Human)
Chr.	Chromosome 20 (human)
Band	20q11.21	Start	31,819,308 bp
Band	20q11.21	End	31,834,689 bp

Gene location (Mouse)
Chr.	Chromosome 2 (mouse)
Band	2|2 H1	Start	152,753,272 bp
Band	2|2 H1	End	152,764,988 bp
RNA expression pattern
Bgee	Human / Mouse (ortholog); Top expressed in: muscle of thigh; Skeletal muscle tissue of rectus abdominis; gastrocnemius muscle; vastus lateralis muscle; biceps brachii; Skeletal muscle tissue of biceps brachii; tibialis anterior muscle; deltoid muscle; body of pancreas; testicle / Top expressed in: muscle of thigh; triceps brachii muscle; temporal muscle; sternocleidomastoid muscle; skeletal muscle tissue; quadriceps femoris muscle; medial head of gastrocnemius muscle; digastric muscle; tibialis anterior muscle; knee joint; More reference expression data
BioGPS	n/a
Gene ontology
Molecular function	transferase activity; nucleotide binding; protein kinase activity; calmodulin binding; myosin light chain kinase activity; kinase activity; protein serine/threonine kinase activity; protein binding; calmodulin-dependent protein kinase activity; ATP binding; myosin light chain binding
Cellular component	cytoplasm; sarcomere; nucleus
Biological process	regulation of muscle filament sliding; cardiac muscle contraction; phosphorylation; cardiac muscle tissue morphogenesis; skeletal muscle satellite cell differentiation; protein phosphorylation; neuromuscular synaptic transmission; positive regulation of gene expression; skeletal muscle cell differentiation; protein autophosphorylation; peptidyl-threonine phosphorylation; striated muscle contraction; peptidyl-serine phosphorylation; intracellular signal transduction
Sources:Amigo / QuickGO
Orthologs
Databases	NCBI: entry; OMA: entry
Species	Human	Mouse
Entrez	85366	228785
Ensembl	ENSG00000101306	ENSMUSG00000027470
UniProt	Q9H1R3	Q8VCR8
RefSeq (mRNA)	NM_033118	NM_001081044
RefSeq (protein)	NP_149109	NP_001074513
Location (UCSC)	Chr 20: 31.82 – 31.83 Mb	Chr 2: 152.75 – 152.76 Mb
PubMed search
- Wikidata
View/Edit Human	View/Edit Mouse

Myosin light chain kinase 2 also known as MYLK2 is an enzyme which in humans is encoded by the MYLK2 gene.

== Function ==
This gene encodes a myosin light chain kinase, a calcium / calmodulin dependent enzyme, that is exclusively expressed in adult skeletal muscle. The MYLK2 gene expresses skMLCK more prevalently in fast twitch muscle fibers as compared to slow twitch muscle fibers. Calmodulin is composed of two terminal domains (N,C) each containing two E-F hand motifs that bind to Ca2+. Upon saturation of Ca2+, Calmodulin undergoes a conformation change allowing it to bind with a target protein such as skMLCK. An image depicting a similar complex (sdCen/skMLCK2) is shown under myosin light chain kinase. This binding to skMLCK increases the affinity of Ca2+ and ultimately leads to a sustained muscle action.

== Clinical significance ==
Mutations in the MYLK2 gene have been linked to midventricular hypertrophic cardiomyopathy.
