= Myosin regulatory light chain 12B =

Protein-coding gene in humans

MYL12B

Identifiers
- Aliases: MYL12B, MLC-B, MRLC2, myosin light chain 12B
- External IDs: OMIM: 609211; MGI: 1914518; GeneCards: MYL12B

Gene location (Human)
Chr.	Chromosome 18 (human)
Band	18p11.31	Start	3,261,479 bp
Band	18p11.31	End	3,278,461 bp

Gene location (Mouse)
Chr.	Chromosome 17 (mouse)
Band	17|17 E1.3	Start	71,300,651 bp
Band	17|17 E1.3	End	71,309,873 bp
RNA expression pattern
Bgee	Human / Mouse (ortholog); Top expressed in: gingival epithelium; pancreatic ductal cell; mucosa of colon; mucosa of sigmoid colon; right lung; jejunal mucosa; renal medulla; mucosa of transverse colon; islet of Langerhans; right adrenal gland / Top expressed in: endothelial cell of lymphatic vessel; right lung lobe; external carotid artery; internal carotid artery; left lung lobe; vas deferens; calvaria; myocardium of ventricle; soleus muscle; decidua; More reference expression data
BioGPS	n/a
Gene ontology
Molecular function	calcium ion binding; myosin heavy chain binding; protein binding; metal ion binding
Cellular component	myosin II complex; cytosol; apical part of cell; Z discdkac; extracellular exosome; brush border; myosin complex; stress fiber; cell cortex region
Biological process	muscle contraction; regulation of cell shape
Sources:Amigo / QuickGO
Orthologs
Databases	NCBI: entry; OMA: entry
Species	Human	Mouse
Entrez	103910	67268
Ensembl	ENSG00000118680	ENSMUSG00000024048
UniProt	O14950	n/a
RefSeq (mRNA)	NM_033546; NM_001144944; NM_001144945; NM_001144946	NM_026064; NM_001357820
RefSeq (protein)	NP_001138416; NP_001138417; NP_291024; NP_001289976; NP_001289977 NP_001289978; NP_006462	n/a
Location (UCSC)	Chr 18: 3.26 – 3.28 Mb	Chr 17: 71.3 – 71.31 Mb
PubMed search
- Wikidata
View/Edit Human	View/Edit Mouse

Myosin regulatory light chain 12B is a protein that in humans is encoded by the MYL12B gene. The gene is also known as MLC-B and MRLC2. The activity of nonmuscle myosin II is regulated by phosphorylation of a regulatory light chain, such as MYL12B. This phosphorylation results in higher ATPase activity and the assembly of myosin II filaments.

== See also ==
- Myosin regulatory light chain 12A
