= MYLK =

Gene of the immunoglobulin superfamily

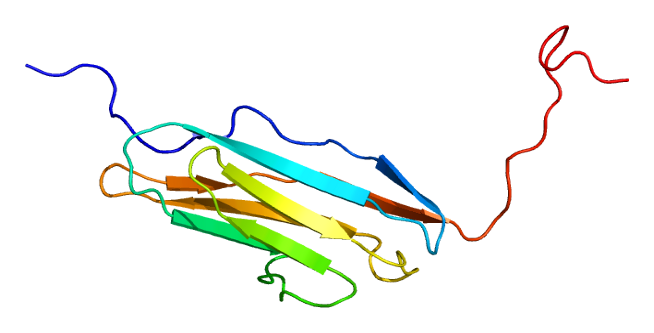

Identifiers
- Aliases: MYLK, AAT7, KRP, MLCK, MLCK1, MLCK108, MLCK210, MSTP083, MYLK1, smMLCK, myosin light chain kinase, MMIHS, MMIHS1, MYLK-L
- External IDs: OMIM: 600922; MGI: 894806; GeneCards: MYLK
Available structures
PDB	Ortholog search: PDBe RCSB
PDB	List of PDB id codes 2CQV, 2K0F, 2YR3
Enzyme activity
EC #	BRENDA	ExPASy	KEGG	MetaCyc
2.7.11.18	↗	↗	↗	↗

Gene location (Human)
Chr.	Chromosome 3 (human)
Band	3q21.1	Start	123,610,049 bp
Band	3q21.1	End	123,884,332 bp

Gene location (Mouse)
Chr.	Chromosome 16 (mouse)
Band	16|16 B3	Start	34,565,580 bp
Band	16|16 B3	End	34,822,790 bp
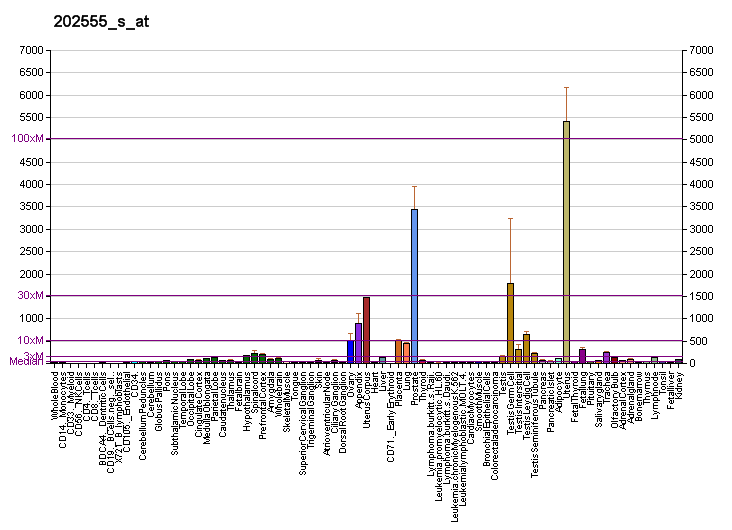
RNA expression pattern
Bgee	Human / Mouse (ortholog); Top expressed in: tail of epididymis; saphenous vein; seminal vesicula; nipple; urethra; vena cava; superficial temporal artery; myometrium; caput epididymis; corpus epididymis / Top expressed in: iris; ascending aorta; umbilical cord; migratory enteric neural crest cell; uterus; aortic valve; tunica media of zone of aorta; ciliary body; cervix; pineal gland; More reference expression data
BioGPS	More reference expression data
Gene ontology
Molecular function	transferase activity; nucleotide binding; protein kinase activity; metal ion binding; calmodulin binding; myosin light chain kinase activity; kinase activity; protein serine/threonine kinase activity; protein binding; actin binding; ATP binding
Cellular component	cytoplasm; cytosol; cell projection; stress fiber; cleavage furrow; cytoskeleton; lamellipodium; plasma membrane; actin cytoskeleton
Biological process	smooth muscle contraction; muscle contraction; phosphorylation; tonic smooth muscle contraction; positive regulation of cell migration; positive regulation of wound healing; bleb assembly; cellular hypotonic response; protein phosphorylation; aorta smooth muscle tissue morphogenesis; positive regulation of calcium ion transport
Sources:Amigo / QuickGO
Orthologs
Databases	NCBI: entry; OMA: entry
Species	Human	Mouse
Entrez	4638	107589
Ensembl	ENSG00000065534	ENSMUSG00000022836
UniProt	Q15746	Q6PDN3
RefSeq (mRNA)	NM_001321309; NM_005965; NM_053025; NM_053026; NM_053027 NM_053028; NM_053029; NM_053030; NM_053031; NM_053032	NM_139300
RefSeq (protein)	NP_001308238; NP_444253; NP_444254; NP_444255; NP_444256 NP_444259; NP_444260	NP_647461; NP_001395190; NP_001395191; NP_001395192
Location (UCSC)	Chr 3: 123.61 – 123.88 Mb	Chr 16: 34.57 – 34.82 Mb
PubMed search
- Wikidata
View/Edit Human	View/Edit Mouse

Myosin light chain kinase, smooth muscle also known as kinase-related protein (KRP) or telokin is an enzyme that in humans is encoded by the MYLK gene.

== Function ==
This gene, a muscle member of the immunoglobulin superfamily, encodes a myosin light-chain kinase, which is a calcium-/calmodulin-dependent enzyme. This kinase phosphorylates myosin regulatory light chains to facilitate myosin interaction with actin filaments to produce contractile activity. This gene encodes both smooth muscle and nonmuscle isoforms. In addition, using a separate promoter in an intron in the 3' region, it encodes telokin, a small protein identical in sequence to the C-terminus of myosin light chain kinase, that is independently expressed in smooth muscle and functions to stabilize unphosphorylated myosin filaments. A pseudogene is located on the p arm of chromosome 3. Four transcript variants that produce four isoforms of the calcium/calmodulin dependent enzyme have been identified as well as two transcripts that produce two isoforms of telokin. Additional variants have been identified but lack full length transcripts.

== See also ==
- Myosin light-chain kinase
