= MYH6 =

Protein-coding gene in the species Homo sapiens

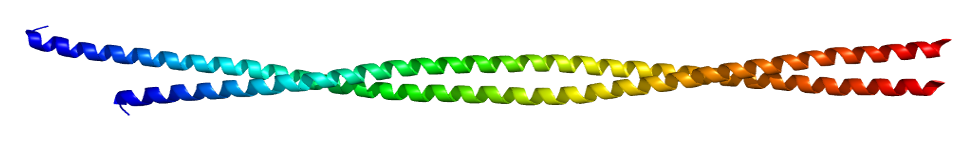

Identifiers
- Aliases: MYH6, ASD3, CMD1EE, CMH14, MYHC, MYHCA, SSS3, alpha-MHC, myosin, heavy chain 6, cardiac muscle, alpha, myosin heavy chain 6
- External IDs: OMIM: 160710; MGI: 97255; GeneCards: MYH6

Gene location (Human)
Chr.	Chromosome 14 (human)
Band	14q11.2	Start	23,381,982 bp
Band	14q11.2	End	23,408,273 bp

Gene location (Mouse)
Chr.	Chromosome 14 (mouse)
Band	14 C3|14 28.01 cM	Start	55,179,378 bp
Band	14 C3|14 28.01 cM	End	55,204,384 bp
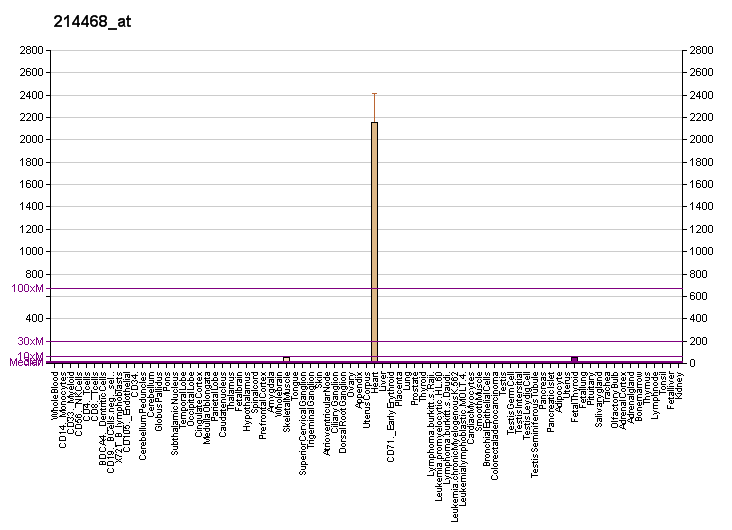
RNA expression pattern
Bgee	Human / Mouse (ortholog); Top expressed in: cardiac muscle tissue of right atrium; vena cava; right auricle of heart; right ventricle; myocardium of left ventricle; apex of heart; glutes; thoracic diaphragm; triceps brachii muscle; gastrocnemius muscle / Top expressed in: cardiac muscle tissue of left ventricle; atrium; interventricular septum; atrioventricular junction; atrioventricular valve; right ventricle; aortic valve; endocardial cushion; lung; right lung; More reference expression data
BioGPS	More reference expression data
Gene ontology
Molecular function	nucleotide binding; calmodulin binding; ATPase activity; actin binding; cytoskeletal motor activity; ATP binding; protein kinase binding; myosin phosphatase activity; actin filament binding; microfilament motor activity; microtubule motor activity; microtubule binding
Cellular component	cytoplasm; cytosol; sarcomere; myofibril; myosin filament; muscle myosin complex; myosin complex; stress fiber; Z discdkac
Biological process	muscle contraction; ventricular cardiac muscle tissue morphogenesis; ATP metabolic process; muscle filament sliding; atrial cardiac muscle tissue morphogenesis; protein dephosphorylation; in utero embryonic development; regulation of the force of heart contraction; regulation of heart rate; striated muscle contraction; adult heart development; visceral muscle development; regulation of heart contraction; regulation of blood pressure; cardiac muscle hypertrophy in response to stress; actin filament-based movement; myofibril assembly; BMP signaling pathway; regulation of ATP-dependent activity; sarcomere organization; cardiac muscle contraction; canonical Wnt signaling pathway; regulation of heart growth; microtubule-based movement
Sources:Amigo / QuickGO
Orthologs
Databases	NCBI: entry; OMA: entry
Species	Human	Mouse
Entrez	4624	17888
Ensembl	ENSG00000197616	ENSMUSG00000040752
UniProt	P13533	Q02566
RefSeq (mRNA)	NM_002471	NM_001164171; NM_010856
RefSeq (protein)	NP_002462	NP_001157643; NP_034986
Location (UCSC)	Chr 14: 23.38 – 23.41 Mb	Chr 14: 55.18 – 55.2 Mb
PubMed search
- Wikidata
View/Edit Human	View/Edit Mouse

Myosin heavy chain, α isoform (MHC-α) is a protein that in humans is encoded by the MYH6 gene. This isoform is distinct from the ventricular/slow myosin heavy chain isoform, MYH7, referred to as MHC-β. MHC-α isoform is expressed predominantly in human cardiac atria, exhibiting only minor expression in human cardiac ventricles. It is the major protein comprising the cardiac muscle thick filament, and functions in cardiac muscle contraction. Mutations in MYH6 have been associated with late-onset hypertrophic cardiomyopathy, atrial septal defects and sick sinus syndrome.

== Structure ==
MHC-α is a 224 kDa protein composed of 1939 amino acids. The MYH6 gene is located on chromosome 14q12, approximately ~4kb downstream of the MYH7 gene encoding the other major cardiac muscle isoform of myosin heavy chain, MHC-β. MHC-α is a hexameric, asymmetric motor forming the bulk of the thick filament in cardiac muscle; it is the predominant isoform expressed in human cardiac atria, and the lesser expressed isoform (7%) expressed in human cardiac ventricles. MHC-α is composed of N-terminal globular heads (20 nm) that project laterally, and alpha helical tails (130 nm) that dimerize and multimerize into a coiled-coil motif to form the light meromyosin (LMM), thick filament rod. The 9 nm alpha-helical neck region of each MHC-α head non-covalently binds two light chains, atrial essential light chain (MYL4) and atrial regulatory light chain (MYL7). Approximately 300 myosin molecules constitute one thick filament.

== Function ==
MHC-α isoform is abundantly expressed in both cardiac atria and cardiac ventricles during embryonic development. Following birth, cardiac ventricles predominantly express the MHC-β isoform and cardiac atria predominantly express the MHC-α isoform.

The two isoforms of cardiac MHC, α and β, display 93% homology. MHC-α and MHC-β display significantly different enzymatic properties, with α having 150-300% the contractile velocity and 60-70% actin attachment time as that of β.

It is the enzymatic activity of the ATPase in the myosin head that cyclically hydrolyzes ATP, fueling the myosin power stroke. This process converts chemical to mechanical energy, and propels shortening of the sarcomeres in order to generate intraventricular pressure and power. An accepted mechanism for this process is that ADP-bound myosin attaches to actin while thrusting tropomyosin inwards, then the S1-S2 myosin lever arm rotates ~70° about the converter domain and drives actin filaments towards the M-line.

== Clinical significance ==
The first mutation identified in MYH6 by Niimura et al. was found in a patient population with late-onset hypertrophic cardiomyopathy. An Arg to Gln variant was found at position 795 (Arg795Gln). This mutation was located in a region of MHC-α shown to be important for binding essential light chain. Subsequent studies have also found additional mutations in MYH6 linked to both hypertrophic cardiomyopathy and dilated cardiomyopathy.

Mutations in MYH6 cause atrial septal defect. One underlying mutation is a missense substitution at Ile820Asn, which alters the association of alpha-myosin heavy chain with regulatory light chain. MYH6 has been shown to be the predominant sarcomeric disease gene for secundum-type atrial septal defects. Additional studies unveiled an association between MYH6 mutations and a wide array of cardiac malformations in addition to atrial septal defect, including one non-sense mutation, one splicing site mutation and seven non-synonymous coding mutations.

MYH6 has also been identified as a susceptibility gene for sick sinus syndrome. A missense mutation at Arg721Trp was identified as conferring a lifetime risk of 50% for carriers. An in-frame 3-bp deletion mutation in MYH6, in which one residue in MHC-α is removed, enhances the binding of MHC-α to myosin binding protein-C and disrupts normal sarcomere function and cardiac atrial conduction velocity.

== Cardiomyopathy from mutation R403Q ==
Hypertrophic cardiomyopathy (HCM) is a cardiac disease that has some characteristic abnormalities including hypertrophy of the septal wall, disorganized cardiac myocytes, and increase fibrosis within the myocardium. The majority of familial HCM cases have been linked to a mutation in beta-myosin heavy chains converting a single amino acid from an arginine to a glutamine at the 403rd position. More than half of affected people die by the age of 40 because of HCM due to R403Q. The R403Q mutation interferes with the beta-myosin heavy chain and therefore greatly hinders the functionality of the heart muscle. Specifically, the affected muscle cells have slower contractile velocities, have depressed actin-activated ATPase rates, and have increased stiffness.

Due to the fact that the cause of the R403Q mutation lies within the region that encodes for the globular myosin head, alterations in the myosin head structure greatly impairs its ability to strongly interact with actin and form a stable cross-bridge. The development of HCM is multifaceted, but the R403Q mutation is one of the most influential risk factors. Of the hundreds of pathogenic mutations that give rise to HCM, R403Q mutations in myosin heavy chain genes are present in over half of them. Since HCM is such a debilitating disease, investigation into possible therapeutic approaches to treat some of the causes of HCM- or at the very least provide palliative care for people affected by this condition- is of extreme importance.

== Myh6 knockdown as a therapy for HCM ==
HCM is an autosomal dominant disease and conventional treatments are ineffective. Gene therapy is currently being investigated as a possible treatment option. Myh6 gene is a possible target for gene therapy. Infected with adeno-associated vectors carrying the siRNA to silence the mutant Mhy6 gene, inhibited expression of R403Q myosin postponed development of HCM for 6 months. Without the dysfunctional myosin protein the heart functioned more efficiently and this prevents the development of myocyte hypertrophy as a compensatory mechanism. Not only was there an absence of HCM, but fibrosis and myocyte disorganization was greatly reduced in the knockdown mice. The proposed mechanism for this is the expression of a more normalized ratio of α-myosin chain to β-myosin chain proteins. This enables proper assembly of myofibrils and thus, more organized sarcomeres. All of the mice in the study developed HCM after 11 months and that the gene therapy was only temporarily therapeutic.
