= MYL9 =

Protein-coding gene in the species Homo sapiens

Identifiers
- Aliases: MYL9, LC20, MLC-2C, MLC2, MRLC1, MYRL2, myosin light chain 9, MMIHS4
- External IDs: OMIM: 609905; MGI: 2138915; GeneCards: MYL9

Gene location (Human)
Chr.	Chromosome 20 (human)
Band	20q11.23	Start	36,541,497 bp
Band	20q11.23	End	36,551,447 bp

Gene location (Mouse)
Chr.	Chromosome 2 (mouse)
Band	2|2 H1	Start	156,617,340 bp
Band	2|2 H1	End	156,623,578 bp
RNA expression pattern
Bgee	Human / Mouse (ortholog); Top expressed in: popliteal artery; tibial arteries; right coronary artery; thoracic aorta; ascending aorta; Descending thoracic aorta; left coronary artery; saphenous vein; muscle layer of sigmoid colon; apex of heart / Top expressed in: ascending aorta; aortic valve; tunica media of zone of aorta; atrium; cervix; migratory enteric neural crest cell; blood; umbilical cord; calvaria; external carotid artery; More reference expression data
BioGPS	n/a
Gene ontology
Molecular function	calcium ion binding; structural constituent of muscle; metal ion binding
Cellular component	myosin complex; cytosol; muscle myosin complex
Biological process	platelet aggregation; regulation of muscle contraction; muscle contraction; regulation of megakaryocyte differentiation
Sources:Amigo / QuickGO
Orthologs
Databases	NCBI: entry; OMA: entry
Species	Human	Mouse
Entrez	10398	98932
Ensembl	ENSG00000101335	ENSMUSG00000067818
UniProt	P24844	Q9CQ19
RefSeq (mRNA)	NM_181526; NM_006097	NM_172118
RefSeq (protein)	NP_006088; NP_852667	NP_742116
Location (UCSC)	Chr 20: 36.54 – 36.55 Mb	Chr 2: 156.62 – 156.62 Mb
PubMed search
- Wikidata
View/Edit Human	View/Edit Mouse

Myosin regulatory light polypeptide 9 is a protein that in humans is encoded by the MYL9 gene.

== Function ==
Myosin, a structural component of muscle, consists of two heavy chains and four light chains. The protein encoded by this gene is a myosin light chain that may regulate muscle contraction by modulating the ATPase activity of myosin heads. The encoded protein binds calcium and is activated by myosin light chain kinase. Two transcript variants encoding different isoforms have been found for this gene.
