= Ischemic cardiomyopathy =

Ischemic Cardiomyopathy
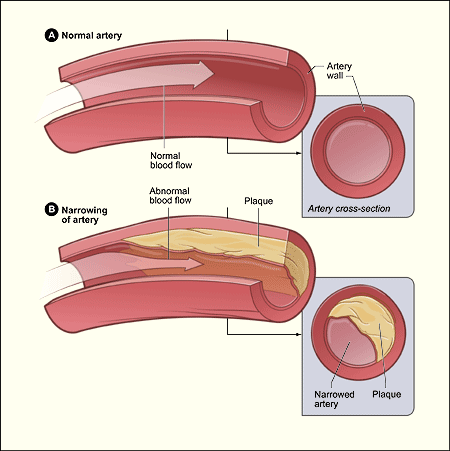
- Atherosclerosis one of the causes of this condition
- Pronunciation: /ɪˈskiːmɪk/
- Specialty: Cardiology
- Symptoms: Sudden fatigue
- Causes: Atherosclerosis, Vasospasm
- Diagnostic method: MRI
- Treatment: Percutaneous intervention

Ischemic cardiomyopathy is a type of cardiomyopathy caused by a narrowing of the coronary arteries which supply blood to the heart. Typically, patients with ischemic cardiomyopathy have a history of acute myocardial infarction, however, it may occur in patients with coronary artery disease, but without a past history of acute myocardial infarction. This cardiomyopathy is one of the leading causes of sudden cardiac death. The adjective ischemic means characteristic of, or accompanied by, ischemia — local anemia due to mechanical obstruction of the blood supply.

== Signs and symptoms ==
Signs and symptoms of ischemic cardiomyopathy include sudden fatigue, shortness of breath, dizziness, and palpitations.

== Cause ==
Ischemic cardiomyopathy is the cause of more than 60% of all cases of systolic congestive heart failure in most countries of the world. A chest radiograph that demonstrates coronary artery calcification is a probable indication of ischemic cardiomyopathy. The following are causes of ischemic cardiomyopathy:

- Diabetes
- Atherosclerosis
- Vasospasm
- Inflammation of arteries

== Pathophysiology ==
Ischemic cardiomyopathy is caused by too little blood flow and hence oxygen reaching the muscular layer of the heart due to a narrowing of coronary arteries in turn causing cell death. This can cause different levels of tissue injury and affect large and intermediate arteries alike.

== Diagnosis ==
Ischemic cardiomyopathy can be diagnosed via magnetic resonance imaging (MRI) protocol, imaging both global and regional function. Also the Look-Locker technique is used to identify diffuse fibrosis; it is therefore important to be able to determine the extent of the ischemic scar. Some argue that only left main- or proximal-left anterior descending artery disease is relevant to the diagnostic criteria for ischemic cardiomyopathy. Myocardial imaging usually demonstrates left ventricular dilation, severe ventricular dysfunction, and multiple infarctions. Signs include congestive heart failure, angina edema, weight gain and fainting, among others.

== Management ==
Cardiac-Stem-Cells

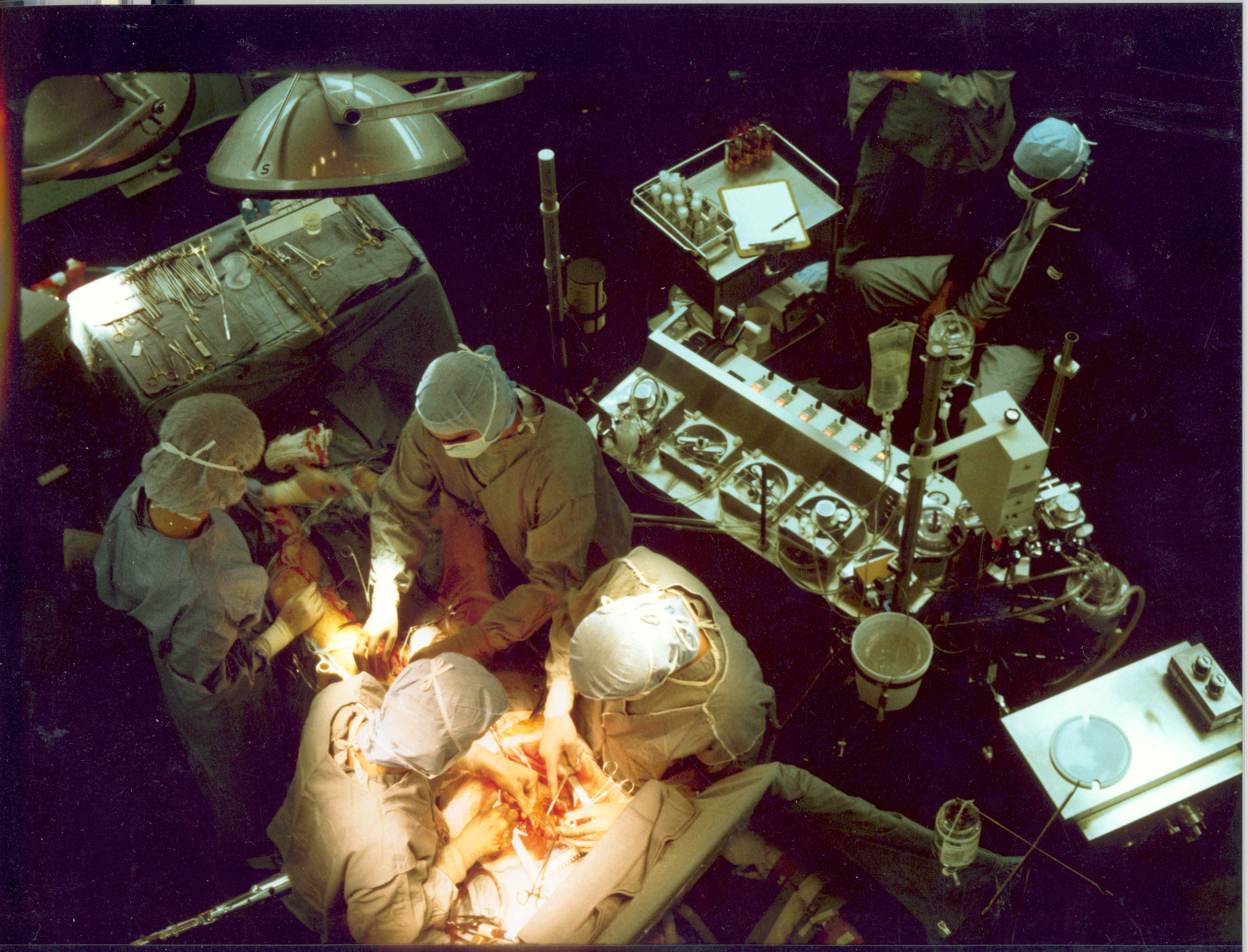
Coronary bypass surgery

Restoring adequate blood flow to the heart muscle in people with heart failure and significant coronary artery disease is strongly associated with improved survival, some research showing up to 75% survival rates over 5 years. A stem cell study indicated that using autologous cardiac stem cells as a regenerative approach for the human heart (after a heart attack) has great potential.

American Heart Association practice guidelines recommend implantable cardioverter-defibrillator (ICD) use in those with ischemic cardiomyopathy (40 days post-MI) that are (NYHA) New York Heart Association functional class I. A LVEF measurement (simply called LVEF alone among cardiologists) of greater than (>) 30% is often used to differentiate primary from ischemic cardiomyopathy, and as a prognostic indicator.

A 2004 study showed the patients in that study who underwent ventricular restoration as well as a coronary artery bypass achieved greater postoperative LVEF than with the latter surgery alone. Severe cases are treated with heart transplantation.

== Prognosis ==
One of the most important features differentiating ischemic cardiomyopathy from the other forms of cardiomyopathy is the shortened, or worsened all-cause mortality in patients with ischemic cardiomyopathy. According to several studies, coronary artery bypass graft surgery has a survival advantage over medical therapy (for ischemic cardiomyopathy) across varied follow-ups.
