= Myosin-7 =

Protein-coding gene in the species Homo sapiens

MYH7
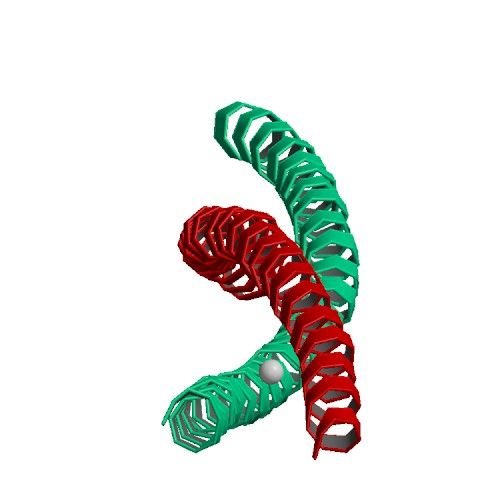

Identifiers
- Aliases: MYH7, CMD1S, CMH1, MPD1, MYHCB, SPMD, SPMM, myosin, heavy chain 7, cardiac muscle, beta, myosin heavy chain 7
- External IDs: OMIM: 160760; MGI: 2155600; GeneCards: MYH7
Available structures
PDB	Ortholog search: PDBe RCSB
PDB	List of PDB id codes 3DTP, 4DB1, 4P7H, 4XA1, 4XA3, 4XA4, 4XA6, 4PA0, 5CHX, 5CJ0, 5CJ4, 5CJ1, 2FXO, 2FXM

Gene location (Human)
Chr.	Chromosome 14 (human)
Band	14q11.2	Start	23,412,740 bp
Band	14q11.2	End	23,435,660 bp

Gene location (Mouse)
Chr.	Chromosome 14 (mouse)
Band	14 C3|14 28.01 cM	Start	55,208,141 bp
Band	14 C3|14 28.01 cM	End	55,232,083 bp
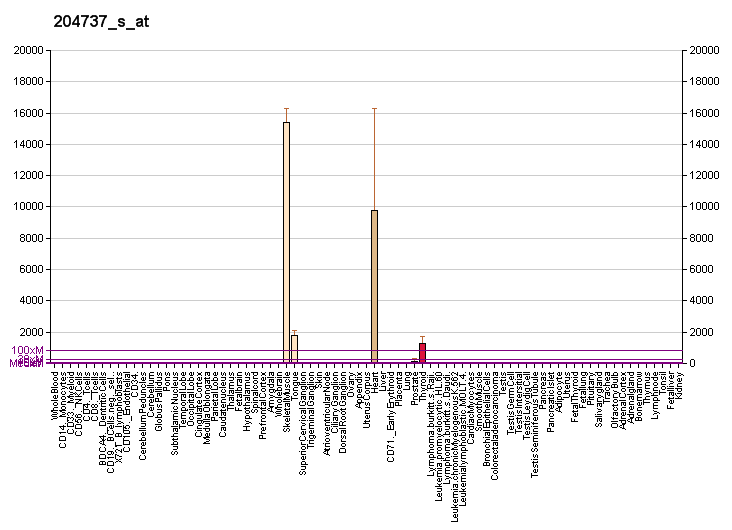

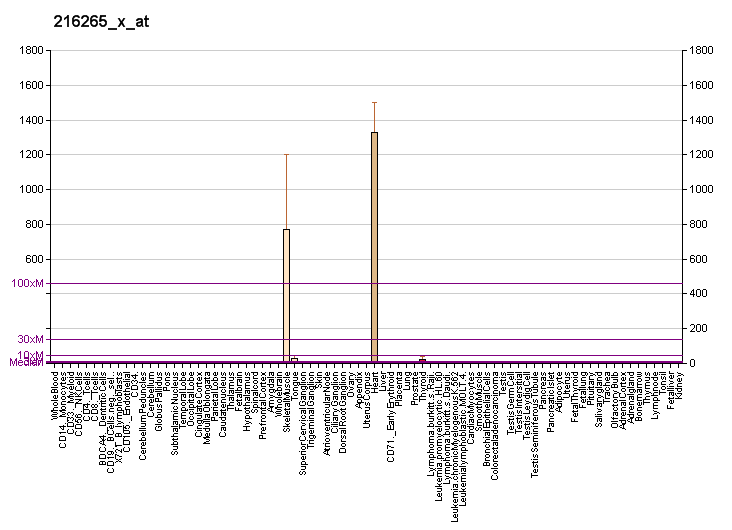
RNA expression pattern
Bgee	Human / Mouse (ortholog); Top expressed in: apex of heart; muscle of thigh; Skeletal muscle tissue of biceps brachii; gastrocnemius muscle; right ventricle; left ventricle; glutes; triceps brachii muscle; myocardium of left ventricle; vastus lateralis muscle / Top expressed in: soleus muscle; atrioventricular valve; endocardial cushion; ankle; plantaris muscle; cardiac muscle tissue of left ventricle; extraocular muscle; thoracic diaphragm; intercostal muscle; internal carotid artery; More reference expression data
BioGPS	More reference expression data
Gene ontology
Molecular function	nucleotide binding; calmodulin binding; protein binding; actin binding; cytoskeletal motor activity; ATP binding; ATPase activity; microfilament motor activity; actin filament binding; microtubule motor activity; microtubule binding
Cellular component	cytoplasm; stress fiber; Z discdkac; myosin filament; myosin complex; muscle myosin complex; myofibril; sarcomere
Biological process	cardiac muscle contraction; adult heart development; transition between fast and slow fiber; regulation of the force of heart contraction; skeletal muscle contraction; regulation of slow-twitch skeletal muscle fiber contraction; regulation of heart rate; ventricular cardiac muscle tissue morphogenesis; ATP metabolic process; muscle filament sliding; striated muscle contraction; regulation of the force of skeletal muscle contraction; muscle contraction; cardiac muscle hypertrophy in response to stress; microtubule-based movement
Sources:Amigo / QuickGO
Orthologs
Databases	NCBI: entry; OMA: entry
Species	Human	Mouse
Entrez	4625	140781
Ensembl	ENSG00000092054	ENSMUSG00000053093
UniProt	P12883	Q91Z83
RefSeq (mRNA)	NM_000257	NM_080728; NM_001361607
RefSeq (protein)	NP_000248	NP_542766; NP_001348536
Location (UCSC)	Chr 14: 23.41 – 23.44 Mb	Chr 14: 55.21 – 55.23 Mb
PubMed search
- Wikidata
View/Edit Human	View/Edit Mouse

Myosin-7 is a protein that in humans is encoded by the MYH7 gene.

It is the myosin heavy chain beta (MHC-β) isoform (slow twitch) expressed primarily in the heart, but also in skeletal muscles (type I fibers). This isoform is distinct from the fast isoform of cardiac myosin heavy chain, MYH6, referred to as MHC-α. MHC-β is the major protein comprising the thick filament that forms the sarcomeres in cardiac muscle and plays a major role in cardiac muscle contraction.

== Structure ==
MHC-β is a 223 kDa protein composed of 1935 amino acids. MHC-β is a hexameric, asymmetric motor forming the bulk of the thick filament in cardiac muscle. MHC-β is composed of N-terminal globular heads (20 nm) that project laterally, and alpha helical tails (130 nm) that dimerize and multimerize into a coiled-coil motif to form the light meromyosin (LMM), thick filament rod. The 9 nm alpha-helical neck region of each MHC-β head non-covalently binds two light chains, essential light chain (MYL3) and regulatory light chain (MYL2). Approximately 300 myosin molecules constitute one thick filament. There are two isoforms of cardiac MHC, α and β, which display 93% homology. MHC-α and MHC-β display significantly different enzymatic properties, with α having 150-300% the contractile velocity and 60-70% actin attachment time as that of β. MHC-β is predominately expressed in the human ventricle, while MHC-α is predominantly expressed in human atria.

== Function ==
It is the enzymatic activity of the ATPase in the myosin head that cyclically hydrolyzes ATP, fueling the myosin power stroke. This process converts chemical to mechanical energy, and propels shortening of the sarcomeres in order to generate intraventricular pressure and power. An accepted mechanism for this process is that ADP-bound myosin attaches to actin while thrusting tropomyosin inwards, then the S1-S2 myosin lever arm rotates ~70° about the converter domain and drives actin filaments towards the M-line.

== Interactions ==
A sequence (IALKGG*KKQLQK) present in both MYH6 and MYH7 was shown to be cut by the papain-like protease (PLpro) of SARS-CoV-2. A similar sequence (IALKGG*KI) is found in the viral polyprotein at a protease cleavage site and is a SSHHP sequence. Cleavage of myofibrils was observed in SARS-CoV-2 infected cardiomyocytes, consistent with preoteolysis (see photo).

== Clinical significance ==
Several mutations in MYH7 have been associated with inherited cardiomyopathies. Lowrance et al. were the first to identify the causative mutation Arg403Gln for hypertrophic cardiomyopathy (HCM) in the MYH7 gene. Studies have since identified several more MYH7 mutations, that are estimated to be causal in approximately 40% of HCM cases. This condition is an autosomal-dominant disease, in which a single copy of the variant gene causes enlargement of the left ventricle of the heart. Disease onset usually occurs later in life, perhaps triggered by changes in thyroid hormone function and/or physical stress.

Another condition associated to mutations in this gene is paraspinal and proximal muscle atrophy.

A myopathy caused by a MYH7 mutation in pigs.
