= Myosin light-chain kinase =

Class of kinase enzymes

Myosin Light-Chain kinase, smooth muscle

Identifiers
- Symbol: MYLK
- NCBI gene: 4638
- HGNC: 7590
- OMIM: 600922
- RefSeq: NM_053025
- UniProt: Q15746

Other data
- EC number: 2.7.11.18
- Locus: Chr. 3 qcen-q21
Search for
- Structures: Swiss-model
- Domains: InterPro

myosin light-chain kinase 2, skeletal muscle
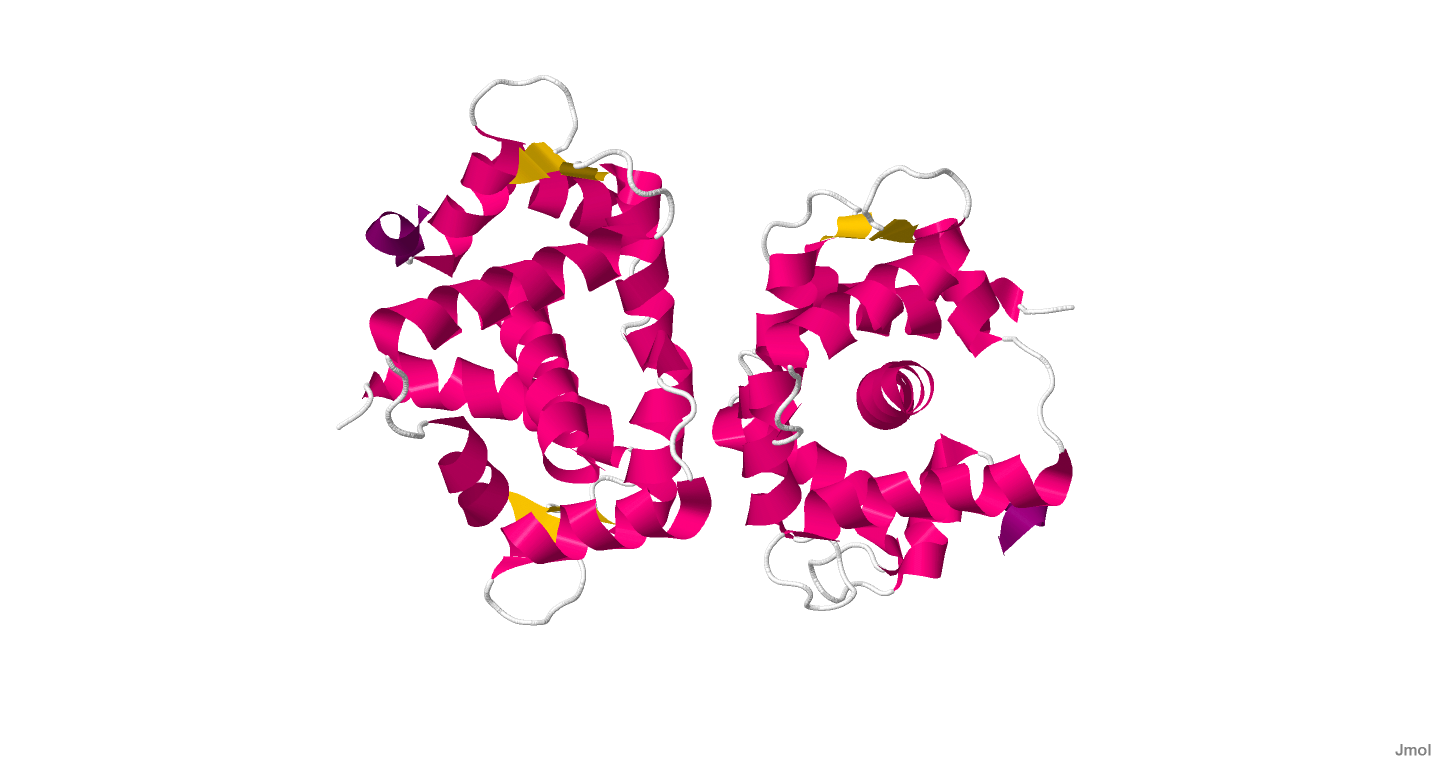
- Crystal structure of the S. dubia centrin / human skeletal muscle myosin light-chain complex.

Identifiers
- Symbol: MYLK2
- NCBI gene: 85366
- HGNC: 16243
- OMIM: 606566
- RefSeq: NM_033118
- UniProt: Q9H1R3

Other data
- Locus: Chr. 20 q13.31
Search for
- Structures: Swiss-model
- Domains: InterPro

myosin light-chain kinase 3, cardiac

Identifiers
- Symbol: MYLK3
- NCBI gene: 91807
- HGNC: 29826
- OMIM: 612147
- RefSeq: NM_182493
- UniProt: Q32MK0

Other data
- Locus: Chr. 16 q11.2
Search for
- Structures: Swiss-model
- Domains: InterPro

Human Myosin Light-Chain Kinase
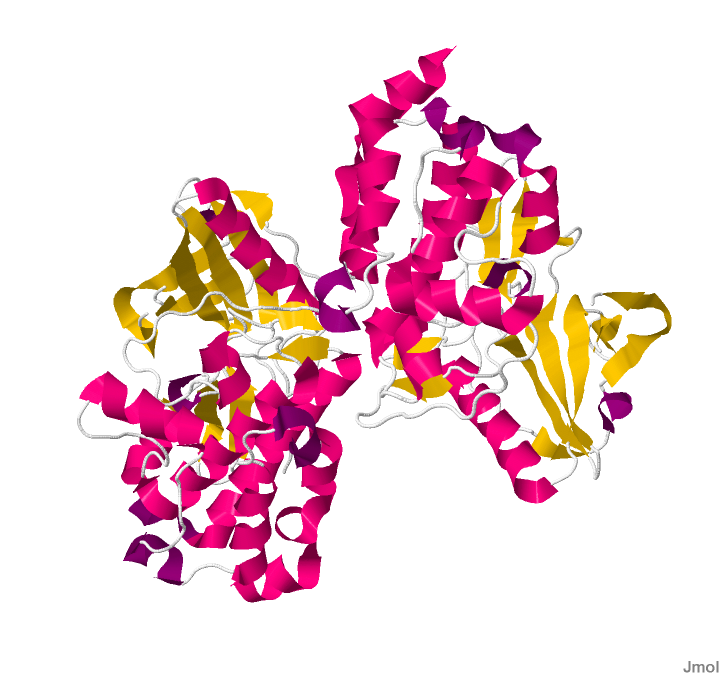
- The Crystal Structure of the Human Myosin Light Chain Kinase Loc340156.

Identifiers
- Symbol: MYLK4
- NCBI gene: 340156
- HGNC: 27972
- RefSeq: NM_001012418
- UniProt: Q86YV6
Search for
- Structures: Swiss-model
- Domains: InterPro

Myosin light-chain kinase also known as MYLK or MLCK is a serine/threonine-specific protein kinase that phosphorylates a specific myosin light chain, namely, the regulatory light chain of myosin II.

== General structural features ==
While there are numerous differing domains depending on the cell type, there are several characteristic domains common amongst all MYLK isoforms. MYLK’s contain a catalytic core domain with an ATP binding domain. On either sides of the catalytic core sit calcium ion/calmodulin binding sites. Binding of calcium ion to this domain increases the affinity of MYLK binding to myosin light chain. This myosin binding domain is located at the C-Terminus end of the kinase. On the other side of the kinase at the N-Terminus end, sits the actin-binding domain, which allows MYLK to form interactions with actin filaments, keeping it in place.

== Isoforms ==
Four different MYLK isoforms exist:

- MYLK1 – smooth muscle
- MYLK2 – skeletal
- MYLK3 – cardiac
- MYLK4 – novel

== Function ==
These enzymes are important in the mechanism of contraction in muscle. Once there is an influx of calcium cations (Ca^{2+}) into the muscle, either from the sarcoplasmic reticulum or from the extracellular space, contraction of smooth muscle fibres may begin. First, the calcium will bind to calmodulin. After the influx of calcium ions and the binding to calmodulin, pp60 SRC (a protein kinase) causes a conformational change in MYLK, activating it and resulting in an increase in phosphorylation of myosin light chain at serine residue 19. The phosphorylation of MLC will enable the myosin crossbridge to bind to the actin filament and allow contraction to begin (through the crossbridge cycle). Since smooth muscle does not contain a troponin complex, as striated muscle does, this mechanism is the main pathway for regulating smooth muscle contraction. Reducing intracellular calcium concentration inactivates MLCK but does not stop smooth muscle contraction since the myosin light chain has been physically modified through phosphorylation(and not via ATPase activity). To stop smooth muscle contraction this change needs to be reversed. Dephosphorylation of the myosin light chain (and subsequent termination of muscle contraction) occurs through activity of a second enzyme known as myosin light-chain phosphatase (MLCP).

== Upstream regulators ==
Protein kinase C and ROC Kinase are involved in regulating Calcium ion intake; these Calcium ions, in turn stimulate a MYLK, forcing a contraction. Rho kinase also modulates the activity of MYLK by downregulating the activity of MYLK's counterpart protein: Myosin Light Chain Phosphatase (MYLP). In addition to downregulation of MYLK, ROCK indirectly strengthens actin/myosin contraction through inhibiting Cofilin, a protein which depolymerizes actin stress fibers. Similar to ROCK, Protein Kinase C regulates MYLK via the CPI-17 protein, which downregulates MYLP.

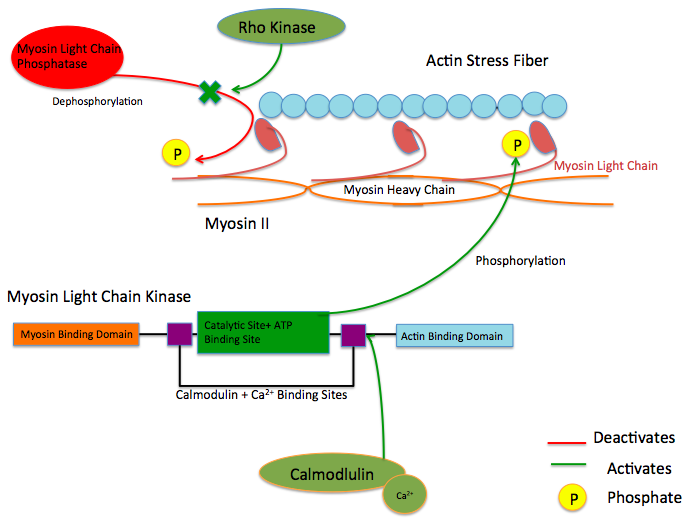
Structural Diagram and Regulation of MYLK

== Mutations and resulting diseases ==
Some pulmonary disorders have been found to arise due to an inability of MYLK to function properly in lung cells. Over-activity in MYLK creates an imbalance in mechanical forces between adjacent endothelial and lung tissue cells. An imbalance may result in acute respiratory distress syndrome, in which fluid is able to pass into the alveoli. Within the cells, MYLK provides an inward pulling force, phosphorylating myosin light chain causing a contraction of the myosin/actin stress fiber complex. Conversely, cell-cell adhesion via tight and adherens junctions, along with anchoring to extra cellular matrix (ECM) via integrins and focal adhesion proteins results in an outward pulling force. Myosin light chain pulls the actin stress fiber attached to the cadherin, resisting the force of the adjacent cell's cadherin. However, when the inward pulling force of the actin stress fiber becomes greater than the outward pulling force of the cell adhesion molecules due to an overactive MYLK, tissues can become slightly pulled apart and leaky, leading to passage of fluid into the lungs.

Another source of smooth muscle disorders like ischemia–reperfusion, hypertension, and coronary artery disease arise when mutations to protein kinase C (PKC) result in excessive inhibition of MYLP, which counteracts the activity of MYLK by dephosphorylating myosin light chain. Because myosin light chain has no inherent phosphate cleaving property over active PKC prevents the dephosphorylation of myosin light protein leaving it in the activated conformation, causing an increase in smooth muscle contraction.

== See also ==
- protein kinase A
