= MYL6 =

Protein-coding gene in the species Homo sapiens

Identifiers
- Aliases: MYL6, ESMLC, LC17, LC17-GI, LC17-NM, LC17A, LC17B, MLC-3, MLC1SM, MLC3NM, MLC3SM, myosin light chain 6
- External IDs: OMIM: 609931; MGI: 109318; GeneCards: MYL6

Gene location (Human)
Chr.	Chromosome 12 (human)
Band	12q13.2	Start	56,158,346 bp
Band	12q13.2	End	56,163,496 bp

Gene location (Mouse)
Chr.	Chromosome 10 (mouse)
Band	10|10 D3	Start	128,326,729 bp
Band	10|10 D3	End	128,330,014 bp
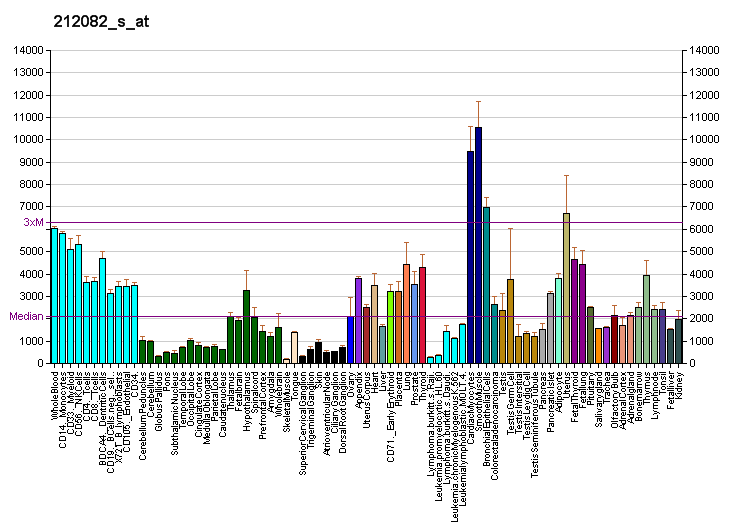
RNA expression pattern
Bgee	Human / Mouse (ortholog); Top expressed in: muscle layer of sigmoid colon; popliteal artery; tibial arteries; left coronary artery; right coronary artery; ascending aorta; Descending thoracic aorta; mucosa of transverse colon; gastric mucosa; body of uterus / Top expressed in: granulocyte; dentate gyrus of hippocampal formation granule cell; right kidney; lip; superior frontal gyrus; yolk sac; neural layer of retina; ventricular zone; primary visual cortex; spermatocyte; More reference expression data
BioGPS	More reference expression data
Gene ontology
Molecular function	calcium ion binding; structural constituent of muscle; cytoskeletal motor activity; protein binding
Cellular component	vesicle; cytosol; unconventional myosin complex; extracellular exosome; membrane; brush border; myosin complex; extracellular matrix
Biological process	muscle contraction; skeletal muscle tissue development; muscle filament sliding
Sources:Amigo / QuickGO
Orthologs
Databases	NCBI: entry; OMA: entry
Species	Human	Mouse
Entrez	4637	17904
Ensembl	ENSG00000092841	ENSMUSG00000090841
UniProt	P60660	Q60605
RefSeq (mRNA)	NM_079425; NM_021019; NM_079423	NM_010860; NM_001317217; NM_001317218; NM_001317219; NM_001317220
RefSeq (protein)	NP_066299; NP_524147	NP_001304146; NP_001304147; NP_001304148; NP_001304149; NP_034990
Location (UCSC)	Chr 12: 56.16 – 56.16 Mb	Chr 10: 128.33 – 128.33 Mb
PubMed search
- Wikidata
View/Edit Human	View/Edit Mouse

Myosin light polypeptide 6 is a protein that in humans is encoded by the MYL6 gene.

Myosin is a hexameric ATPase cellular motor protein. It is composed of two heavy chains, two nonphosphorylatable alkali light chains, and two phosphorylatable regulatory light chains. This gene encodes a myosin alkali light chain that is expressed in smooth muscle and non-muscle tissues. Genomic sequences representing several pseudogenes have been described and two transcript variants encoding different isoforms have been identified for this gene.
