= Contractility =

Contractility refers to the ability for self-contraction, especially of the muscles or similar active biological tissue

- Contractile ring in cytokinesis
- Contractile vacuole
- Muscle contraction
  - Myocardial contractility
- See contractile cell for an overview of cell types in humans.

== See also ==
- motility
