= Rho kinase inhibitor =

Class of pharmacological agent

Rho-kinase inhibitors (rho-associated protein kinase inhibitor or ROCK inhibitor) are a series of compounds that target rho kinase (ROCK) and inhibit the ROCK pathway. Clinical trials have found that inhibition of the ROCK pathway contributes to the cardiovascular benefits of statin therapy. Furthermore, ROCK inhibitors may have clinical applications for anti-erectile dysfunction, antihypertension, and tumor metastasis inhibition. More recently they have been studied for the treatment of glaucoma and as a therapeutic target for the treatment of cardiovascular diseases, including ischemic stroke. While statin therapy has been demonstrated to reduce the risk of major cardiovascular events, including ischemic stroke, the interplay between the ROCK pathway and statin therapy to treat and prevent strokes in older adults has not yet been proven.

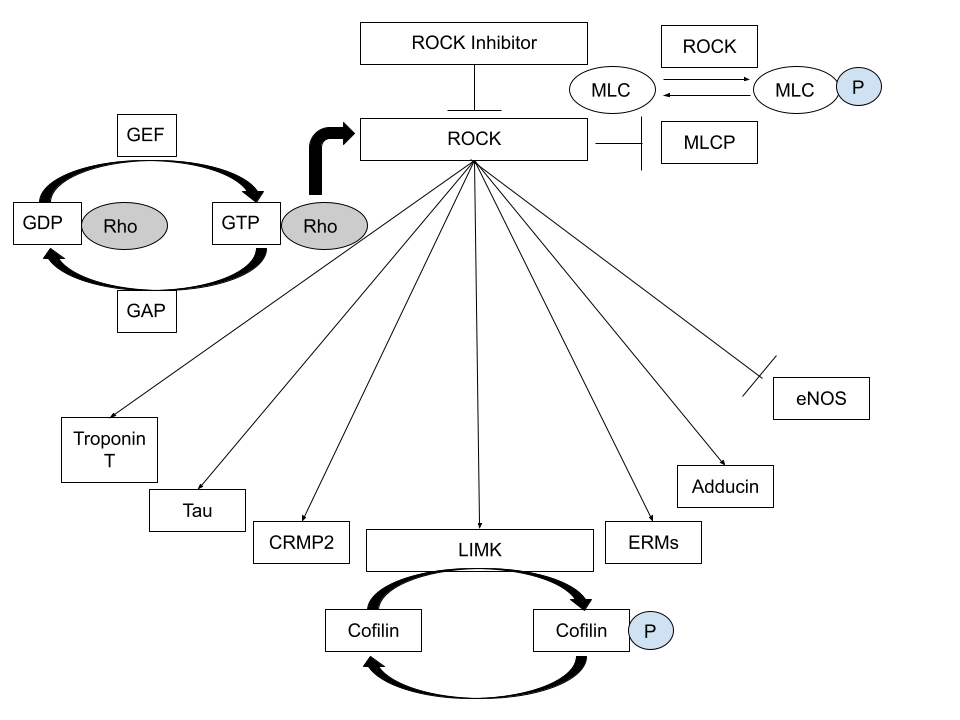
ROCK inhibitor pathway

On a cellular level, ROCK has multiple functions, including regulation of smooth muscle cell contraction, cell migration, and maintenance of cell viability and morphology, in part by regulating stress fibers and focal adhesions. Particularly, ROCK inhibitor is used for cell culture practice, in part to limit cellular death and limited dedifferentiation, and therefore widely adopted for induced pluripotent stem cells (iPSC) and embryonic stem cell cultures, although studies have shown mixed results for other cells types.

== Molecular mechanism ==
Rho kinase inhibitors act on Rho kinase by altering the conformation of the protein, disrupting translocation to the plasma membrane, preventing ATP-dependent phosphorylation, and blocking RhoA binding to ROCK. Some studies suggest that Rho kinase inhibitors also play a role in anti-angiogenesis by blocking ERK and Akt signaling pathways. Rho kinase inhibitor also functions by blocking rho-mediated dephosphorylation of MLC20.

== Examples ==
A number of Rho kinase inhibitors are known.

Chemical structure of fasudil

- AT-13148
- BA-210
- β-Elemene
- Belumosudil
- Chroman 1
- DJ4, which is a selective multi-specific ATP competitive inhibitor of activity of ROCK1 (IC50 of 5 nM), ROCK2 (IC50 of 50 nM), MRCKα (IC50 of 10 nM) and MRCKβ (IC50 of 100 nM) kinases without affecting activity of PAK1 and DMPK at 5 μM concentrations in in vitro cell-free kinase activity assays. DJ4 reduces stress fiber formation, and inhibits migration and invasion of melanoma (A375), breast (MD-MB-231), and non-small cell lung cancer (A549) cells independent of cell death induction.
- Fasudil, not currently approved by the U.S. Food and Drug Administration (FDA), but in Japan and China it is used for improvement and prevention of cerebral vasospasm and the cerebral ischemic symptoms subsequent to subarachnoid hemorrhage surgery.
- GSK-576371
- GSK429286A, C_{21}H_{16}F_{4}N_{4}O_{2}
- H-1152 Inhibitor H-1152 is approximately 9 to 16 times more potent than Y-27632 and HA-1077 (fasudil)
- Hydroxyfasudil, an active metabolite of fasudil
- Ibuprofen
- LX-7101
- Netarsudil, approved in United States for glaucoma and ocular hypertension.
- RKI-1447, a potent small molecule inhibitor of ROCK1 and ROCK2. Studies show that RKI-1447 could have anti-invasive and anti-tumor activities.
- Ripasudil, used in Japan for the treatment of glaucoma and ocular hypertension.
- TCS-7001
- Thiazovivin
- Verosudil (AR-12286)
- Y-27632, the first small molecule ROCK inhibitor. It selectively inhibits ROCK1 with K_{i} of 140 nM.
- Y-30141
- Y-33075
- Y-39983
