= Myosin-light-chain phosphatase =

Myosin Light-Chain Phosphatase
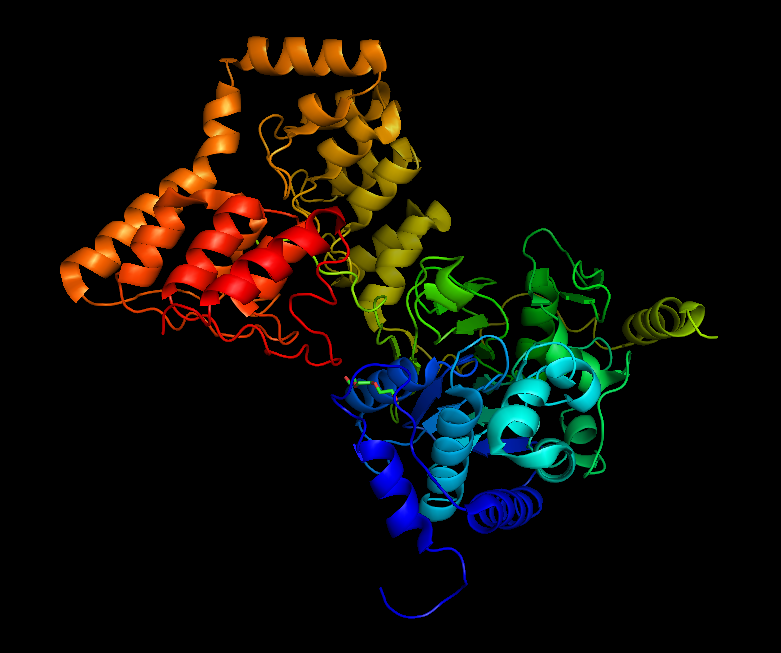
- Structure of complex between PP1 and a portion of MYPT1, generated from 1s70

Identifiers
- EC no.: 3.1.3.53
- CAS no.: 86417-96-1

Databases
- IntEnz: IntEnz view
- BRENDA: BRENDA entry
- ExPASy: NiceZyme view
- KEGG: KEGG entry
- MetaCyc: metabolic pathway
- PRIAM: profile
- PDB structures: RCSB PDB PDBe PDBsum
- Gene Ontology: AmiGO / QuickGO
Search
- PMC: articles
- PubMed: articles
- NCBI: proteins

Myosin light-chain phosphatase, also called myosin phosphatase (EC 3.1.3.53; systematic name [myosin-light-chain]-phosphate phosphohydrolase), is an enzyme (specifically a serine/threonine-specific protein phosphatase) that dephosphorylates the regulatory light chain of myosin II:

[myosin light-chain] phosphate + H_{2}O = [myosin light-chain] + phosphate

This dephosphorylation reaction occurs in smooth muscle tissue and initiates the relaxation process of the muscle cells. Thus, myosin phosphatase undoes the muscle contraction process initiated by myosin light-chain kinase. The enzyme is composed of three subunits: the catalytic region (protein phosphatase 1, or PP1), the myosin binding subunit (MYPT1), and a third subunit (M20) of unknown function. The catalytic region uses two manganese ions as catalysts to dephosphorylate the light-chains on myosin, which causes a conformational change in the myosin and relaxes the muscle. The enzyme is highly conserved and is found in all organisms’ smooth muscle tissue. While it is known that myosin phosphatase is regulated by rho-associated protein kinases, there is current debate about whether other molecules, such as arachidonic acid and cAMP, also regulate the enzyme.

== Function ==
Smooth muscle tissue is mostly made of actin and myosin, two proteins that interact together to produce muscle contraction and relaxation. Myosin II, also known as conventional myosin, has two heavy chains that consist of the head and tail domains and four light chains (two per head) that bind to the heavy chains in the “neck” region. When the muscle needs to contract, calcium ions flow into the cytosol from the sarcoplasmic reticulum, where they activate calmodulin, which in turn activates myosin light-chain kinase (MLC kinase). MLC kinase phosphorylates the myosin light chain (MLC_{20}) at the Ser-19 residue. This phosphorylation causes a conformational change in the myosin, activating crossbridge cycling and causing the muscle to contract. Because myosin undergoes a conformational change, the muscle will stay contracted even if calcium and activated MLC kinase concentrations are brought to normal levels. The conformational change must be undone to relax the muscle.

When myosin phosphatase binds to myosin, it removes the phosphate group. Without the group, the myosin reverts to its original conformation, in which it cannot interact with the actin and hold the muscle tense, so the muscle relaxes. The muscle will remain in this relaxed position until myosin is phosphorylated by MLC kinase and undergoes a conformational change.

== Structure ==
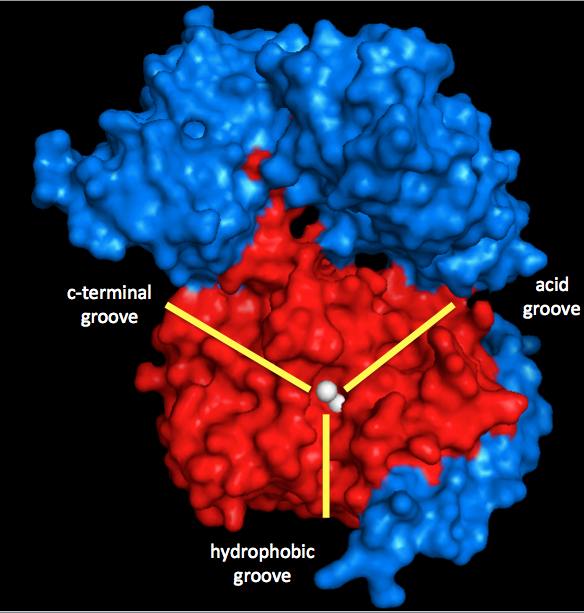
A 3D representation of PP1 (shown in red) and a portion of MYPT1 (shown in blue), with the manganese ion catalysts shown in white. The yellow lines mark the grooves that are critical for enzyme binding and catalysis.

Myosin phosphatase is made of three subunits. The catalytic subunit, PP1, is one of the more important Ser/Thr phosphatases in eukaryotic cells, as it plays a role in glycogen metabolism, intracellular transport, protein synthesis, and cell division as well as smooth muscle contraction. Because it is so important to basic cellular functions, and because there are far fewer protein phosphatases than kinases in cells, PP1’s structure and function is highly conserved (though the specific isoform used in myosin phosphatase is the δ isoform, PP1δ). PP1 works by using two manganese ions as catalysts for the dephosphorylation (see below).

Surrounding these ions is a Y-shaped cleft with three grooves: a hydrophobic, an acidic, and a C-terminal groove. When PP1 is not bonded to any other subunit, it is not particularly specific. However, when it bonds to the second subunit of myosin phosphatase, MYPT1 (MW ~130 kDa), this catalytic cleft changes configuration. This results in a dramatic increase in myosin specificity. Thus, it is clear that MYPT1 has great regulatory power over PP1 and myosin phosphatase, even without the presence of other activators or inhibitors.

The third subunit, M20 (not to be confused with MLC_{20}, the critical regulatory subunit of myosin), is the smallest and most mysterious subunit. Currently little is known about M20, except that it is not necessary for catalysis, as removing the subunit does not affect turnover or selectivity. While some believe it could have regulatory function, nothing has been determined yet.

== Mechanism ==
The mechanism of removing the phosphate from Ser-19 is very similar to other dephosphorylation reactions in the cell, such as the activation of glycogen synthase. Myosin's regulatory subunit MLC_{20} binds to both the hydrophobic and acid grooves of PP1 and MYPT1, the regulatory site on myosin phosphatase. Once in the proper configuration, both the phyosphorylated serine and a free water molecule are stabilized by the hydrogen-bonding residues in the active site, as well as the positively charged ions (which interact strongly with the negative phosphate group). His-125 (on myosin phosphatase) donates a proton to Ser-19 MLC_{20}), and the water molecule attacks the phosphorus atom. After shuffling protons to stabilize (which happens rapidly compared to the attack on phosphorus), the phosphate and alcohol are formed, and both leave the active site.

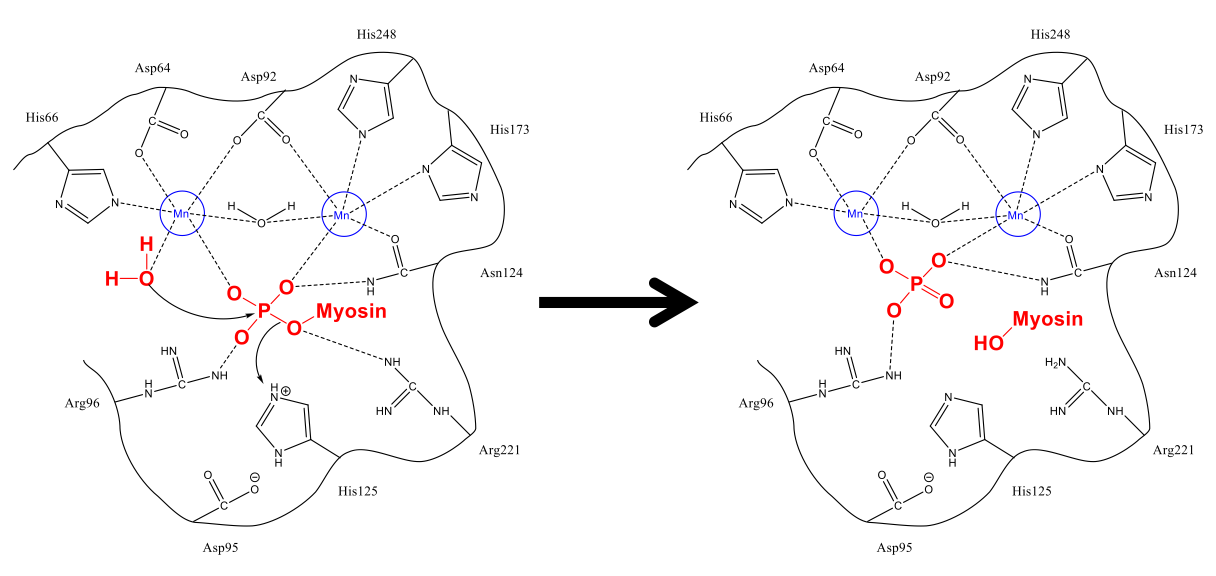
The mechanism of PP1 for myosin phosphatase, with critical enzyme residues shown. The substrates and products are bold and in red, and the manganese ions are in blue. The alcohol group shown on myosin after dephosphorylation is the alcohol on Ser-19.

== Regulation and Human Health ==
The regulatory pathways of MLC kinase have been well-established, but until the late 1980s, it was assumed that myosin phosphatase was not regulated, and contraction/relaxation was entirely dependent on MLC kinase activity. However, since the 1980s, the inhibiting effect of rho-associated protein kinase has been discovered and thoroughly investigated. RhoA GTP activates Rho-kinase, which phosphorylates the MYPT1 at two major inhibitory sites, Thr-696 and Thr-866. This fully demonstrates the value of the MYPT1, not only to increase reaction rate and specificity, but also to greatly slow down the reaction. However, when telokin is added, it effectively undoes the effect of Rho-kinase, even though it does not dephosphorylate MYPT1.

One other proposed regulatory strategy involves arachidonic acid. When arachidonic acid is added to tensed muscle tissue, the acid decreases the rate of dephosphorylation (and thus relaxation) of myosin. However, it is unclear how arachidonic acid functions as an inhibitor. Two competing theories are that either arachidonic acid acts as a co-messenger in the rho-kinase cascade mentioned above, or that it binds to the c-terminal of MYPT1.

When the regulatory systems of myosin phosphatase begin to fail, there can be major health consequences. Since smooth muscle is found in the respiratory, circulatory, and reproductive systems of humans (as well as other places), if the smooth muscle can no longer relax because of faulty regulation, then a wide number of problems ranging from asthma, hypertension, and erectile dysfunction can result.

== See also ==
- Myosin
- Myosin light-chain kinase
- Rhoa
- Rho kinase
