= TC-S 7001 =

Chemical compound

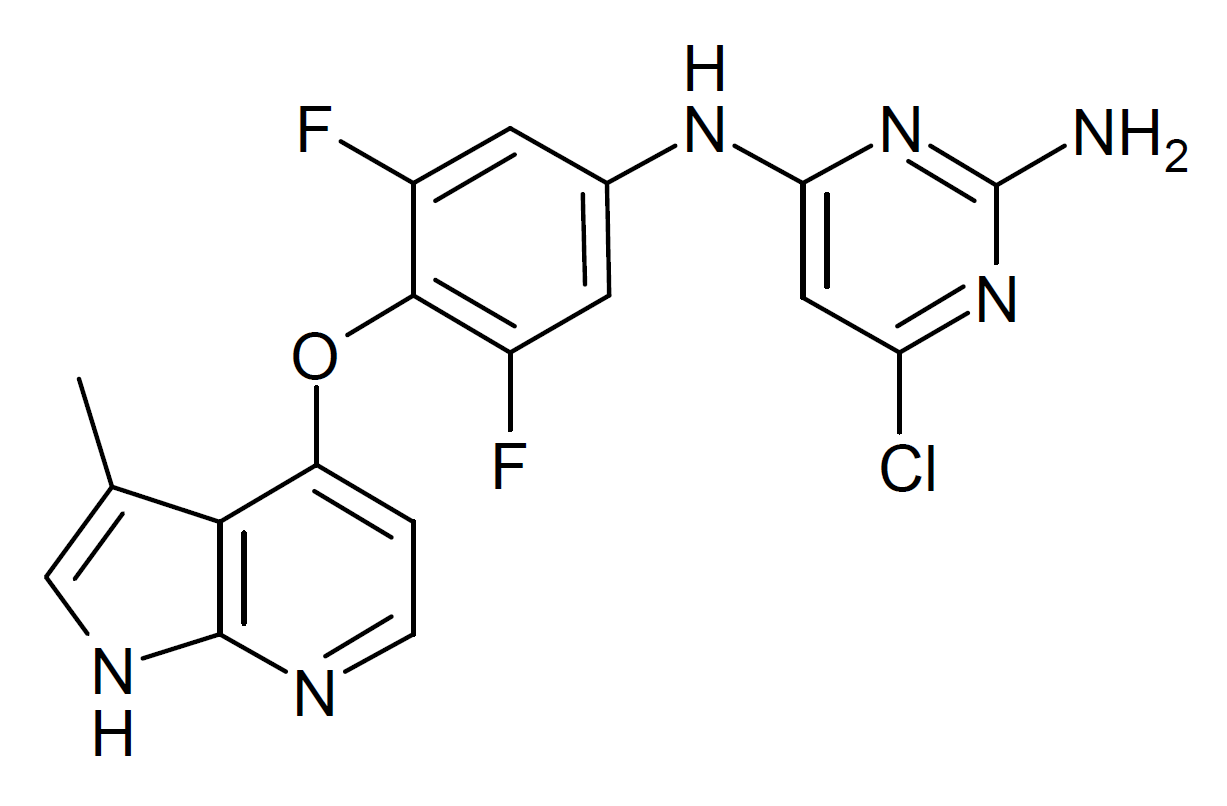

Identifiers
- IUPAC name: 6-chloro-4-N-[3,5-difluoro-4-[(3-methyl-1H-pyrrolo[2,3-b]pyridin-4-yl)oxy]phenyl]pyrimidine-2,4-diamine
- CAS Number: 867017-68-3
- PubChem CID: 11524200
- ChemSpider: 9698986
- ChEMBL: ChEMBL1971943
- CompTox Dashboard (EPA): DTXSID00468040

Chemical and physical data
- Formula: C_{18}H_{13}ClF_{2}N_{6}O
- Molar mass: 402.79 g·mol^{−1}
- 3D model (JSmol): Interactive image
- SMILES: CC1=CNC2=NC=CC(=C12)OC3=C(C=C(C=C3F)NC4=CC(=NC(=N4)N)Cl)F
- InChI: InChI=1S/C18H13ClF2N6O/c1-8-7-24-17-15(8)12(2-3-23-17)28-16-10(20)4-9(5-11(16)21)25-14-6-13(19)26-18(22)27-14/h2-7H,1H3,(H,23,24)(H3,22,25,26,27); Key:NRSGWEVTVGZDFC-UHFFFAOYSA-N

TC-S 7001 (Azaindole-1) is a drug which acts as a potent and selective inhibitor of the enzyme Rho kinase, with an IC_{50} of 0.6 nM at ROCK1 and 1.1 nM at ROCK2. It has vasodilatory effects and has been used in research for a variety of applications.

== See also ==
- Rho kinase inhibitor
