= RNF227 =

Protein-coding gene found in humans

Identifiers
- Aliases: RNF227, uncharacterized LOC284023, long intergenic non-protein coding RNA 2581, LINC02581
- External IDs: GeneCards: RNF227
Orthologs
Databases	NCBI: entry
Species	Human	Mouse
Entrez	284023	n/a
Ensembl	n/a	n/a
UniProt	n a	n/a
RefSeq (mRNA)	n/a	n/a
RefSeq (protein)	n/a	n/a
Location (UCSC)	n/a	n/a
PubMed search		n/a
- Wikidata
View/Edit Human

RING Finger Protein 227 (RNF227) is a protein which in humans is encoded by the RNF227 gene (previously LINC02581). According to DNA microarray data, it is found in at least 15 tissues.

== Gene ==
In humans, the RNF227 gene is found on chromosome 17 p13.1. Its mRNA sequence is 2850 base pairs in length and includes 2 exons. The coding sequence is from base pairs 95 to 2835.

== Protein ==
The RNF227 protein is 190 amino acids in length, seen in the table below.

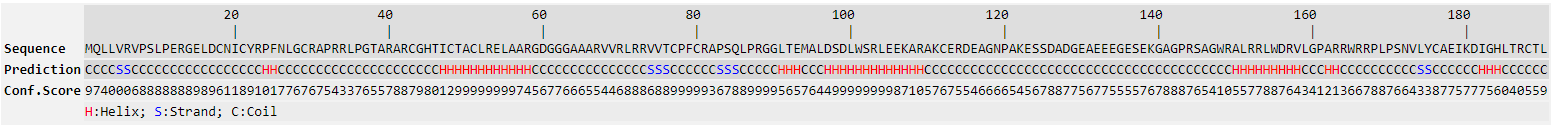
Predicted secondary structure.

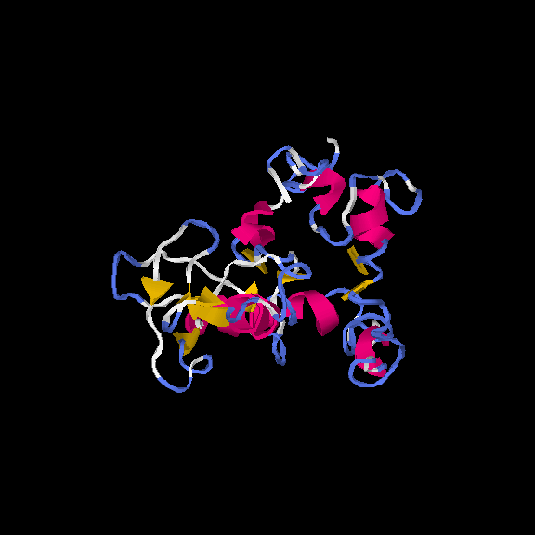
Predicted tertiary structure.

1	MQLLVRVPSL PERGELDCNI CYRPFNLGCR APRRLPGTAR ARCGHTICTA CLRELAARGD
61	GGGAAARVVR LRRVVTCPFC RAPSQLPRGG LTEMALDSDL WSRLEEKARA KCERDEAGNP
121	AKESSDADGE AEEEGESEKG AGPRSAGWRA LRRLWDRVLG PARRWRRPLP SNVLYCAEIK
181	DIGHLTRCTL

=== Predicted properties ===
Using tools at Expasy, the predicted molecular weight of the protein sequence is 20,875 kilodaltons with an isoelectric point of 9.23. The Statistical Analysis of Protein Sequences tool detected two repetitive structures: CRAPRRLP from positions 29 to 36 and CRAPSQLP from positions 80 to 87.

=== Zinc finger domain ===
RING Finger Protein 227 has a zinc finger domain from position 18 to 81, which is highly conserved throughout many eukaryotic organisms.

=== Secondary structure ===
The secondary structure was predicted by the I-TASSER server and shows 7 alpha helices, 4 beta strands, and 12 coils.

=== Tertiary structure ===
The tertiary structure was predicted by the I-TASSER with a confidence score of -3.42, which is typically in the range from -5 to 2.

== Gene level regulation ==
RNA-seq was performed of tissue samples from 95 human individuals representing 27 different tissues in order to determine tissue-specificity of all protein-coding genes. The highest expression can be seen in the skin, with an expression value of 22 ± 4.5 Reads per Kilobase of transcript, per Million mapped reads (RPKM). Transcription profiling was done by high throughput sequencing of individual and mixtures of 16 human tissues RNA to show the highest expression in the testes. Additionally, the lowest expression is seen in the liver. RNA sequencing was conducted of the total RNA from 20 human tissues which showed high expression in the brain, both in the cerebellum and fetal tissues. 35 human fetal samples from 6 tissues (3 – 7 replicates per tissue) collected between 10- and 20-weeks gestational time were sequence using Illumina TruSeq Stranded Total RNA. This shows very high expression in the intestine after 11 weeks and the kidney after 10 weeks.

Three experiments were found that show what conditions RNF227 rises and falls. A study conducted on T cell-driven IL-22 amplification of Il-1beta-driven inflammation in human adipose tissue shows how there is higher expression of RNF227 in obese non-diabetic patients. An analysis of non-invasive NeuN cells and invasive NeuT cells treated with interstitial fluid flow resulted in higher expression of RNF227 in the NeuN cell line in both the static and flow protocols. This gives insight into the molecular pathways activated by interstitial fluid flow in ERBB2-positive breast cancer cells. The last experiment showed how the effect of Rho kinase inhibition on long-term keratinocyte proliferation is rapid and conditional and resulted in higher expression in the control agent as compared to the Y-27632 agent.

== Transcript level regulation ==
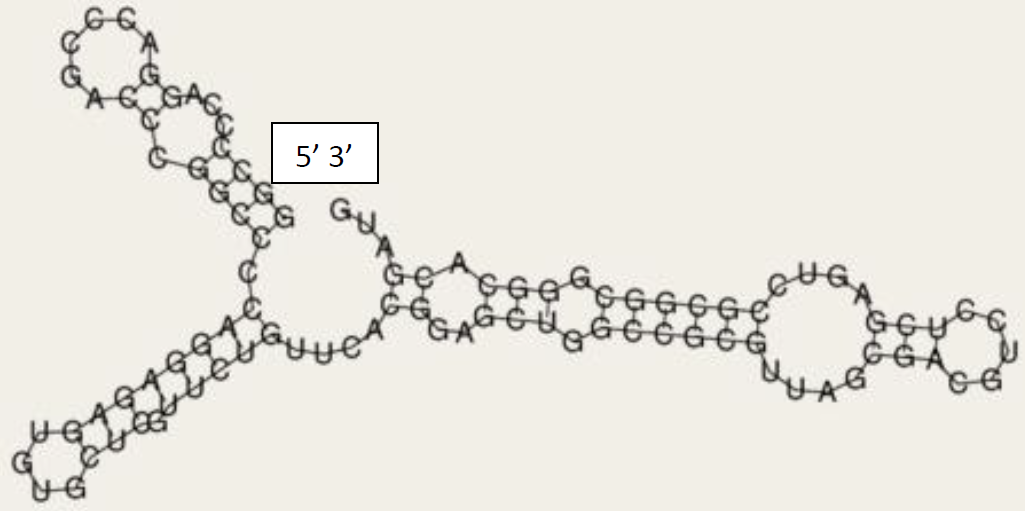
Stem-Loop Diagram of 5' UTR of RNF227.

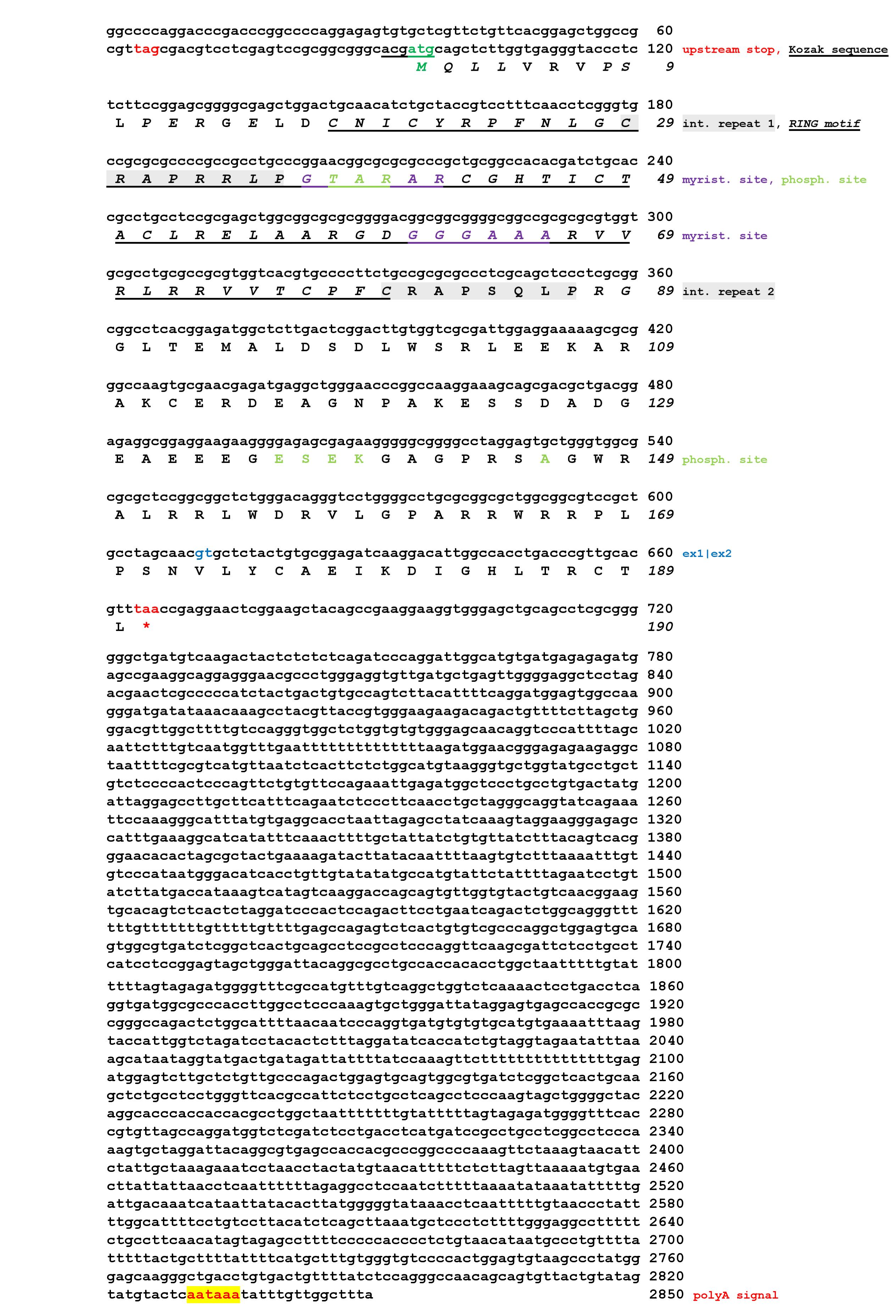
Conceptual translation of RNF227.

The diagram to the right depicts the stem-loop formation of the 5' untranslated region of RNF227. The BED4.02, ZFX.01, and ZIC3.03 transcription factors are seen with RNF227, which is notable because they are all associated with zinc finger domains. Translation is initiated at the AUG start codon, as seen in the conceptual translation.

== Protein level regulation ==
The Motif Scan tool at MyHits predicted casein kinase II phosphorylation sites (from positions 9 to 12, 102 to 105, and 125 to 128), N-myristylation sites (from positions 37 to 42 and 61 to 66), and protein kinase c phosphorylation sites (from positions 38 to 40 and 137 to 139).

Additionally, PSORT II predicted a 69.6% chance for the protein sequence to be found in the nucleus of a cell.

== Homology ==
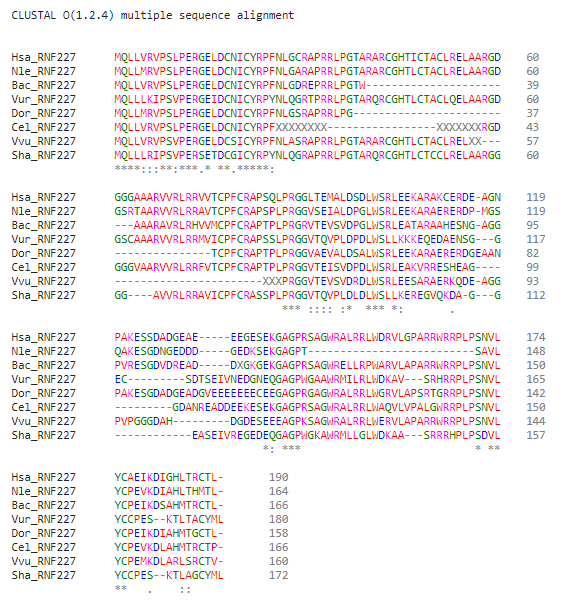
Multiple sequence alignment of mammalian orthologs.

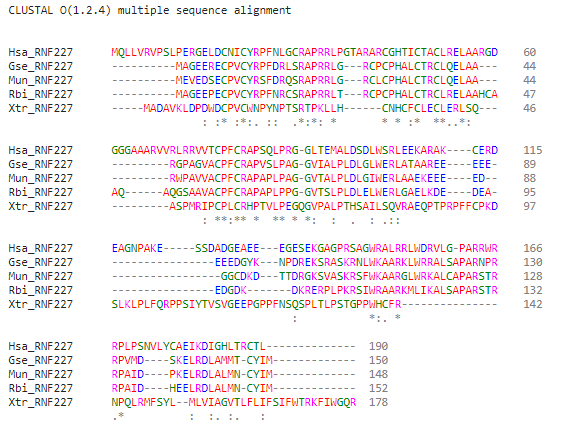
Multiple sequence alignment of amphibian orthologs.

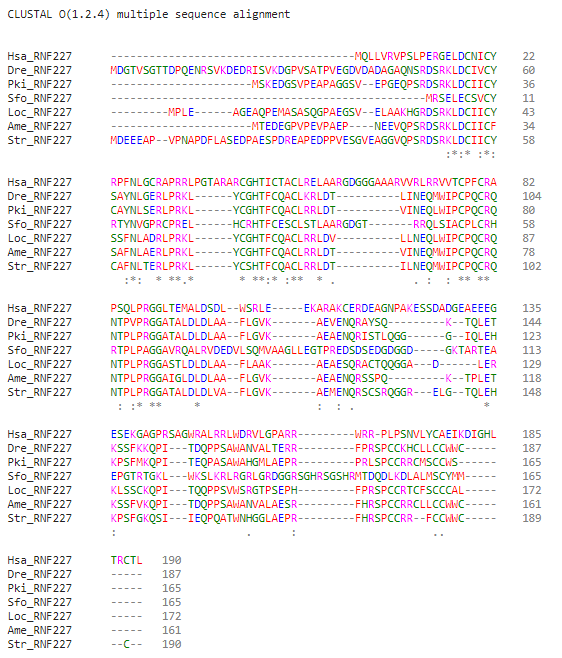
Multiple sequence alignment of fish orthologs.

RING Finger Protein 227 has no paralogs. It does, however, have numerous orthologs extending throughout eukaryotes. The following table presents a selection of orthologs found using searches in BLAST and BLAT. This is not meant to be a comprehensive list, rather a small sample that shows the diversity of species in which orthologs are found.

Genus and Species	Common Name	Taxonomic Group	Date of Divergence (Million Years Ago)	Accession Number	Sequence Length (amino acids)	Sequence Identity	Sequence Similarity
Homo sapiens	Human	Primates	0	NP_001345628.1	190	100%	100%
Neotoma lepida	Desert Woodrat	Rodentia	90	OBS67541.1	164	67.9%	73.7%
Microtus ochrogaster	Prairie vole	Rodentia	90	XP_026636787.1	214	67.4%	74.4%
Dipodomys ordii	Ord's Kangaroo Rat	Rodentia	90	XP_012868576.1	158	64.8%	68.9%
Balaenoptera acutorostrata scammoni	Minke Whale	Artiodactyla	90	XP_028024073.1	166	65.3%	71.1%
Vulpes vulpes	Red Fox	Carnivora	96	XP_025861213.1	160	62.8%	72.3%
Vicugna pacos	Alpaca	Artiodactyla	96	XP_006218277.1	156	24.8%	30.4%
Vombatus ursinus	Common Wombat	Diprotondontia	159	XP_027712916.1	180	62.0%	74.5%
Sarcophilus harrisii	Tasmanian Devil	Dasyuromorphia	159	XP_023358488.2	172	58.8%	66.2%
Gallus gallus	Chicken	Galliformes	312	XP_001234238.1	168	25.9%	36.1%
Geotrypetes seraphini	Gaboon Caecilian	Gymnophiona	351.8	XP_033780950.1	150	37.2%	46.9%
Rhinatrema bivittatum	Two-lined Caecilian	Gymnophiona	351.8	XP_029437562.1	152	35.7%	48.0%
Microcaecilia unicolor	Cayenne Caecilian	Gymnophiona	351.8	XP_030043188.1	148	34.4%	46.9%
Xenopus tropicalis	Western Clawed Frog	Anura	351.8	XP_031750786.1	178	19.1%	43.4%
Scleropages formosus	Asian Arowana	Osteoglossiformes	435	XP_029113159.1	165	30.6%	44.9%
Astyanax mexicanus	Mexican Tetra	Characiformes	435	XP_007231481.2	161	28.0%	37.4%
Paramormyrops kinsleyae	Old Calabar Mormyrid	Osteoglossiformes	435	XP_023674393.1	165	26.6%	32.3%
Lepisosteus oculatus	Spotted Gar	Lepisosteiformes	435	XP_006640609.2	172	24.6%	33.0%
Salmo trutta	Brown Trout	Saloniformes	435	XP_029622555.1	190	24.2%	29.6%
Danio rerio	Zebrafish	Cypriniformes	435	NP_001121828.1	187	23.6%	35.6%
