= RKI-1447 =

Chemical compound

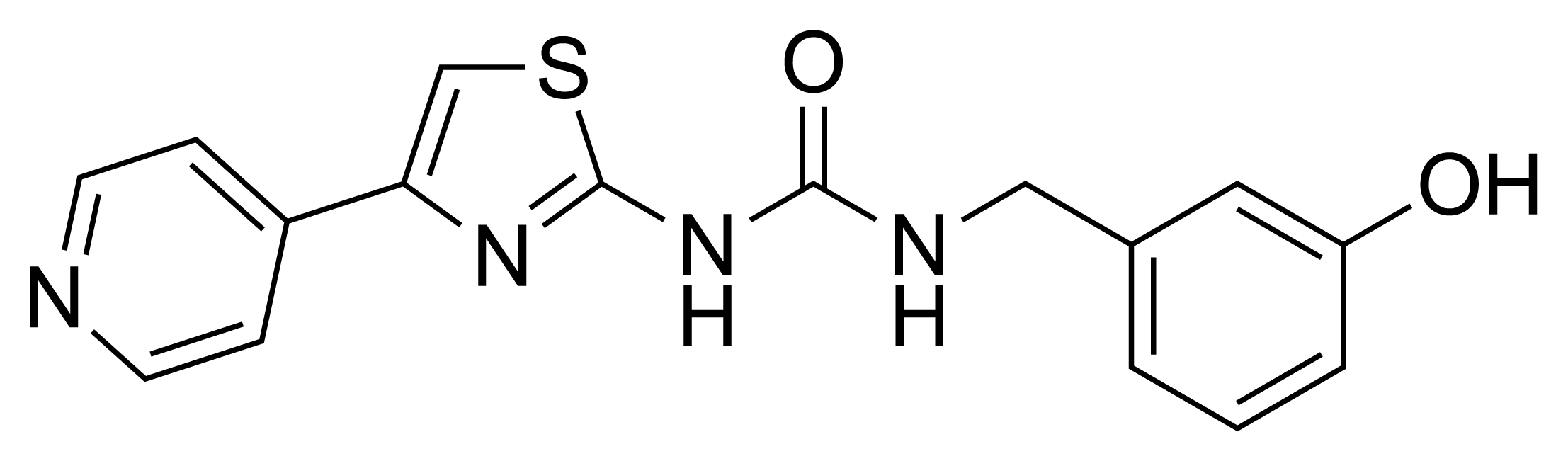

Identifiers
- IUPAC name: 1-[(3-hydroxyphenyl)methyl]-3-(4-pyridin-4-yl-1,3-thiazol-2-yl)urea
- CAS Number: 1342278-01-6
- PubChem CID: 60138149
- ChemSpider: 29315066
- UNII: F8GZ6C9MKZ
- ChEMBL: ChEMBL3218011
- CompTox Dashboard (EPA): DTXSID501336679

Chemical and physical data
- Formula: C_{16}H_{14}N_{4}O_{2}S
- Molar mass: 326.37 g·mol^{−1}
- 3D model (JSmol): Interactive image
- SMILES: C1=CC(=CC(=C1)O)CNC(=O)NC2=NC(=CS2)C3=CC=NC=C3
- InChI: InChI=1S/C16H14N4O2S/c21-13-3-1-2-11(8-13)9-18-15(22)20-16-19-14(10-23-16)12-4-6-17-7-5-12/h1-8,10,21H,9H2,(H2,18,19,20,22); Key:GDVRVPIXWXOKQO-UHFFFAOYSA-N

RKI-1447 is a drug which acts as a potent and selective inhibitor of the enzyme Rho kinase, with an IC_{50} of 14.5 nM at ROCK1 and 6.2 nM at ROCK2. It has been investigated for applications in cancer treatment, as well as glaucoma, and nonalcoholic fatty liver disease.

== See also ==
- Rho kinase inhibitor
