= Verosudil =

Chemical compound

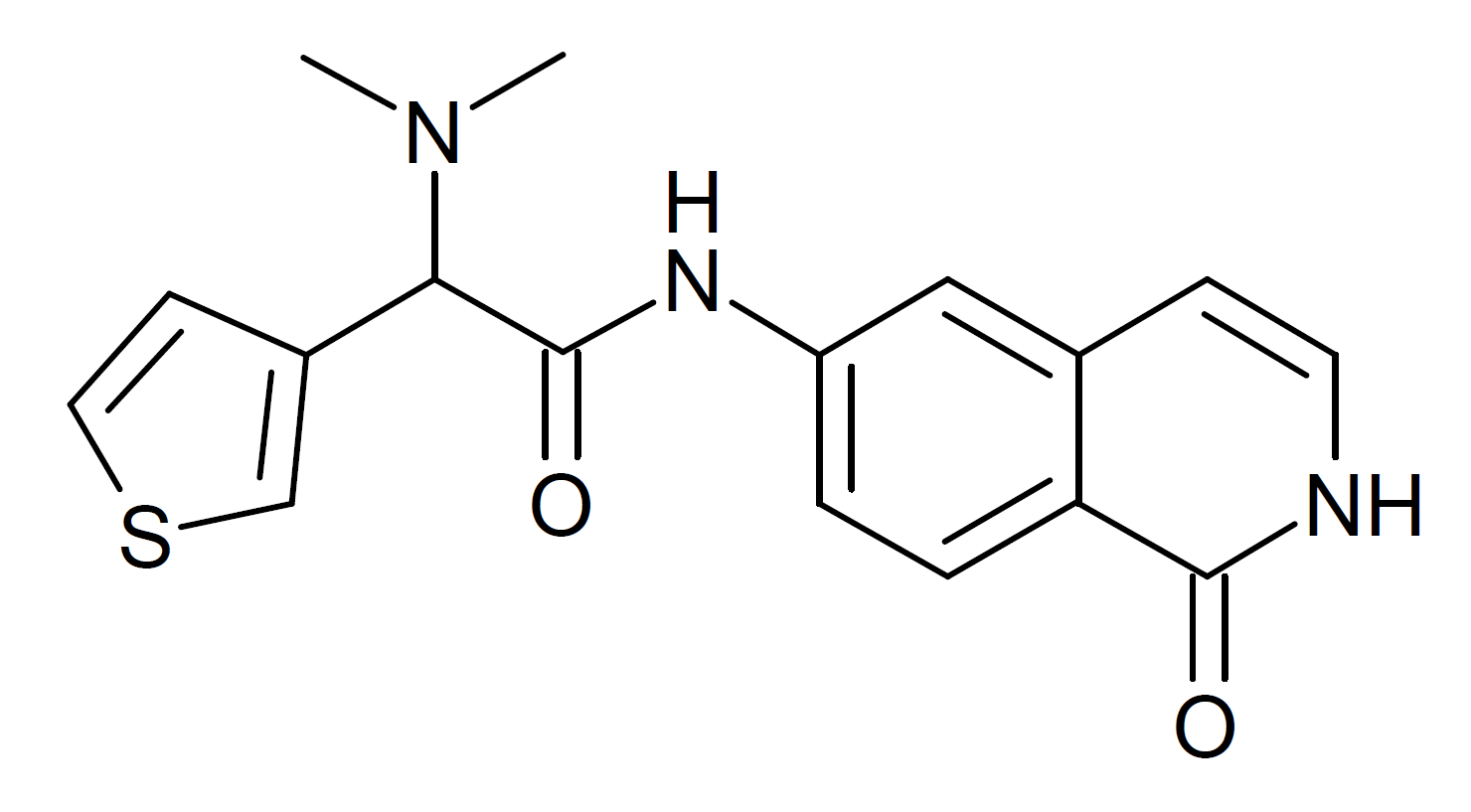

Identifiers
- IUPAC name: 2-(dimethylamino)-N-(1-oxo-2H-isoquinolin-6-yl)-2-thiophen-3-ylacetamide
- CAS Number: 1414854-42-4
- PubChem CID: 66906051
- ChemSpider: 32742441
- UNII: MAF34143WM
- KEGG: D10737
- ChEMBL: ChEMBL3545065
- CompTox Dashboard (EPA): DTXSID801336680

Chemical and physical data
- Formula: C_{17}H_{17}N_{3}O_{2}S
- Molar mass: 327.40 g·mol^{−1}
- 3D model (JSmol): Interactive image
- SMILES: CN(C)C(C1=CSC=C1)C(=O)NC2=CC3=C(C=C2)C(=O)NC=C3
- InChI: InChI=1S/C17H17N3O2S/c1-20(2)15(12-6-8-23-10-12)17(22)19-13-3-4-14-11(9-13)5-7-18-16(14)21/h3-10,15H,1-2H3,(H,18,21)(H,19,22); Key:VDYRZXYYQMMFJW-UHFFFAOYSA-N

Verosudil (AR-12286) is a drug which acts as a potent and selective inhibitor of the enzyme Rho kinase, and has been investigated for the treatment of glaucoma.

== See also ==
- Rho kinase inhibitor
