= Thiazovivin =

Chemical compound

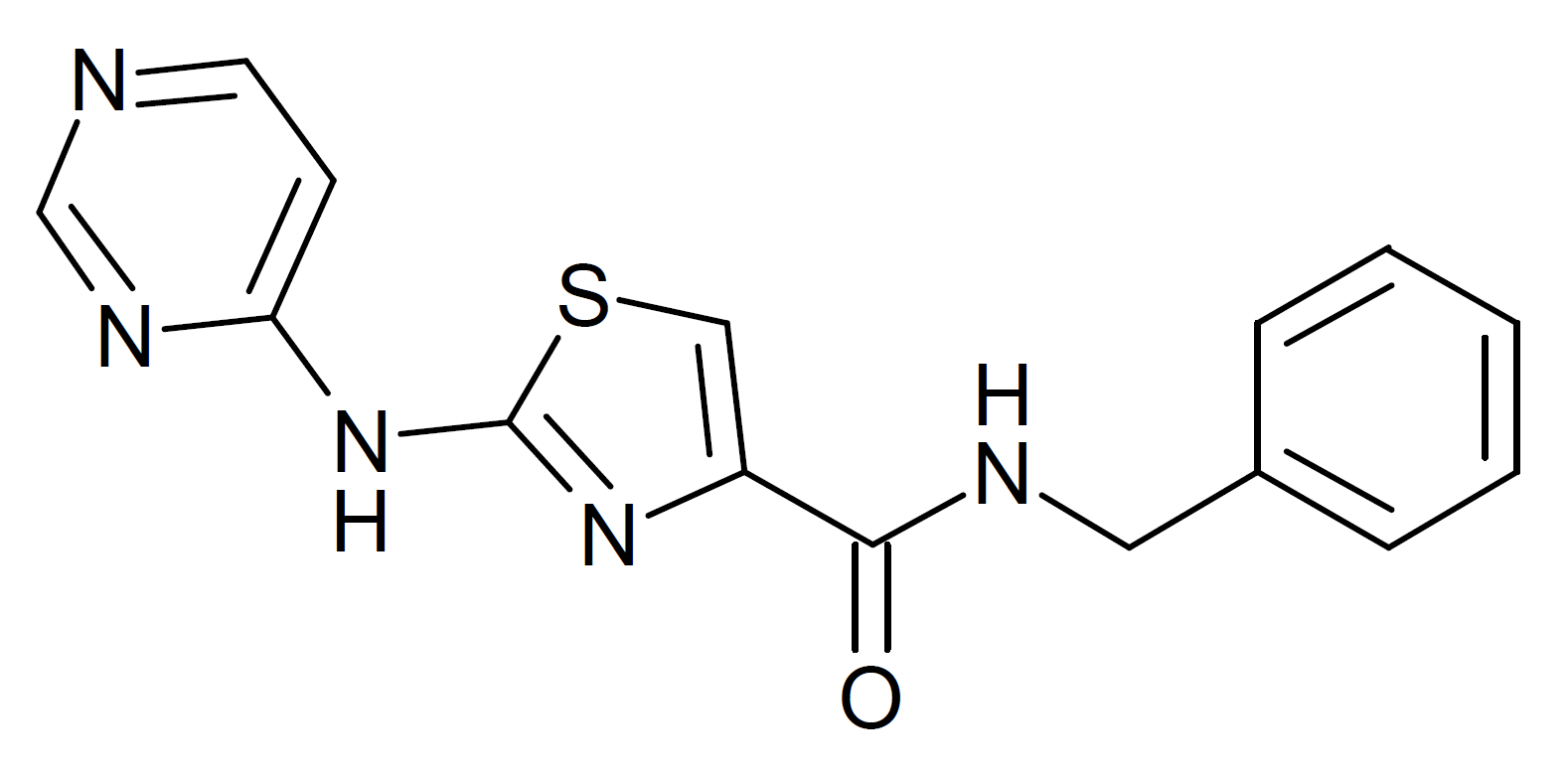

Identifiers
- IUPAC name: N-benzyl-2-(pyrimidin-4-ylamino)-1,3-thiazole-4-carboxamide
- CAS Number: 1226056-71-8
- PubChem CID: 46209426
- ChemSpider: 24597612
- ChEMBL: ChEMBL3184878
- CompTox Dashboard (EPA): DTXSID00673091
- ECHA InfoCard: 100.236.307

Chemical and physical data
- Formula: C_{15}H_{13}N_{5}OS
- Molar mass: 311.36 g·mol^{−1}
- 3D model (JSmol): Interactive image
- SMILES: C1=CC=C(C=C1)CNC(=O)C2=CSC(=N2)NC3=NC=NC=C3
- InChI: InChI=1S/C15H13N5OS/c21-14(17-8-11-4-2-1-3-5-11)12-9-22-15(19-12)20-13-6-7-16-10-18-13/h1-7,9-10H,8H2,(H,17,21)(H,16,18,19,20); Key:DOBKQCZBPPCLEG-UHFFFAOYSA-N

Thiazovivin is a drug which acts as a potent and selective inhibitor of the enzyme Rho kinase. It is used alongside a cocktail of other growth factors and modulators in cell culture techniques for the generation of induced pluripotent stem cells, which can then be used for a wide variety of applications.

== See also ==
- Rho kinase inhibitor
