= SLC66A3 =

Protein found in humans

Identifiers
- Aliases: SLC66A3, C2orf22, PQ loop repeat containing 3, solute carrier family 66 member 3, PQLC3
- External IDs: MGI: 2444067; GeneCards: SLC66A3

Gene location (Human)
Chr.	Chromosome 2 (human)
Band	2p25.1	Start	11,155,198 bp
Band	2p25.1	End	11,178,870 bp

Gene location (Mouse)
Chr.	Chromosome 12 (mouse)
Band	12|12 A1.1	Start	17,038,649 bp
Band	12|12 A1.1	End	17,050,409 bp
RNA expression pattern
Bgee	Human / Mouse (ortholog); Top expressed in: oocyte; secondary oocyte; gonad; monocyte; skin of arm; synovial membrane; decidua; germinal epithelium; Achilles tendon; corpus epididymis / Top expressed in: olfactory epithelium; granulocyte; corneal stroma; lumbar spinal ganglion; choroid plexus of fourth ventricle; stroma of bone marrow; mucous cell of stomach; Ileal epithelium; decidua; carotid body; More reference expression data
BioGPS	n/a
Orthologs
Databases	NCBI: entry; OMA: entry
Species	Human	Mouse
Entrez	130814	217430
Ensembl	ENSG00000162976	ENSMUSG00000045679
UniProt	Q8N755	Q8C6U2
RefSeq (mRNA)	NM_001282710; NM_001282711; NM_001282712; NM_152391	NM_001161111; NM_172574
RefSeq (protein)	NP_001269639; NP_001269640; NP_001269641; NP_689604	NP_766162
Location (UCSC)	Chr 2: 11.16 – 11.18 Mb	Chr 12: 17.04 – 17.05 Mb
PubMed search
- Wikidata
View/Edit Human	View/Edit Mouse

Solute carrier family 66 member 3 is a gene in humans that encodes the protein SLC66A3. The function of the SLC66A3 protein is not yet well understood but belongs to a family of five evolutionarily related proteins, the SLC66 lysosomal amino acid transporters. SLC66A3 is localized to the endoplasmic reticulum and has four transmembrane domains.

== Gene ==
The SLC66A3 is a gene consisting of 26,831 base pairs spanning from 11,155,467 to 11,178,856 on chromosome 2. SLC66A3 mapped to the plus strand at 2p25.1 and contains 7 exons. The SLC66A3 gene is neighbored by the genes ROCK2, C2orf50, and KCNF1. ROCK2 and C2orf50 are both located upstream of SLC66A3 whereas KCNF1 is located upstream.

Chromosome 2. SLC66A3 is located at 2p25.1

== Transcripts ==
SLC66A3 has 14 different mRNAs, there are 12 alternatively-spliced mRNAs that produce functional proteins and 2 unspliced variations that do not. The longest transcript is transcript variant 1 which produces the longest protein at 202 amino acids in length.

== Protein ==
The SLC66A3 protein coding gene that produces a protein with the same name. The mRNA transcript variant 1 is 1,717 bp with 7 exons and produces the longest protein, transcript variant 1. SLC66A3 is a 202 amino acid, 22.6 kDa protein with a theoretical isoelectric point of 9.14.

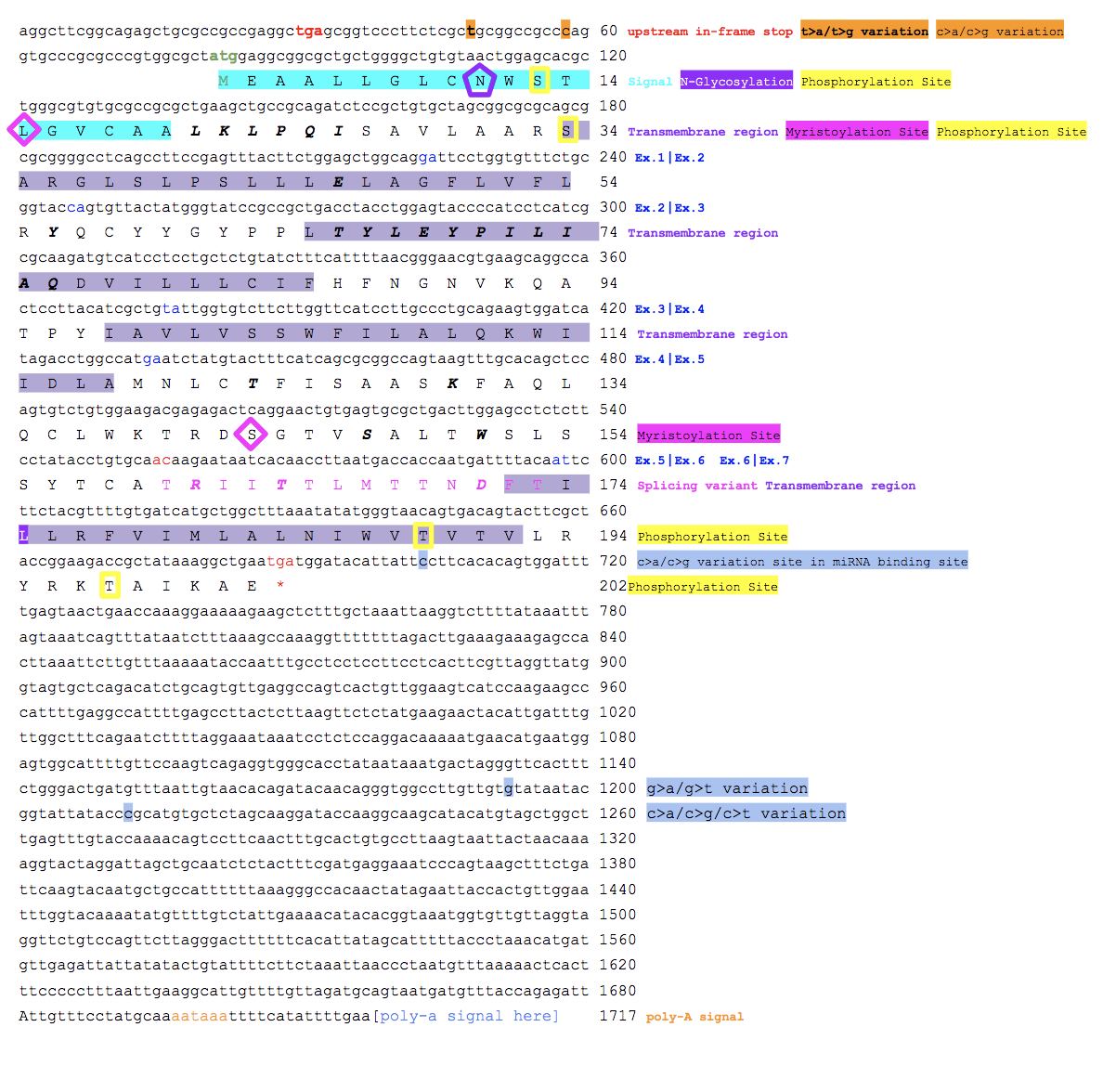
Conceptual Translation of SLC66A3

=== Secondary structure ===
The secondary structure of SLC66A3 is predicted to consist of 7 α-helices. The protein contains a signal peptide, 4 transmembrane regions, and a splicing variant region, and is localized in the endoplasmic reticulum.

=== Tertiary structure ===
I-TASSER predicts that the tertiary structure contains 7 coils with high certainty. DiANNA predicts disulfide bonds between positions 9 - 57, 17 - 121, and 82 - 157.

== Gene level regulation ==
=== Promoter ===
The promoter of SLC66A3 is 1,169 base pairs long and is located 1000 base pairs upstream of the 5' UTR.

=== Transcription factors ===
Many different transcription factors regulate the expression of the SLC66A3 gene. Some of these include RNA polymerase II transcription factor II B, Myc associated zinc fingers, EGR/nerve growth factor induced protein C & related factors, and EVI1-myeloid transforming protein.

Transcription factor	Function
RNA polymerase II transcription factor II B	Stimulation of transcription initiation.
EVI1-myleoid transforming protein	Involved in the proliferation and differentiation of hematopoietic cells through interaction with GATA-2.
Krueppel like transcription factors	Involved in β-globin expression and the development of erythrocytes.
GATA binding factors	Involved in the regulation of transcription during developmental stages and maintaining and developing hematopoietic systems.

=== Expression patterns ===
SLC66A3 is expressed at high levels in a variety of tissues throughout the body but is most highly abundant in the whole blood and white blood cells. SLC66A3 is expressed at high levels, approximately 2.1 times more than the average gene.

== Protein Level Regulation ==
=== Post translational modifications ===
SLC66A3 is predicted to undergo phosphorylation, N-glycosylation, and myristoylation.

== Homology/Evolution ==
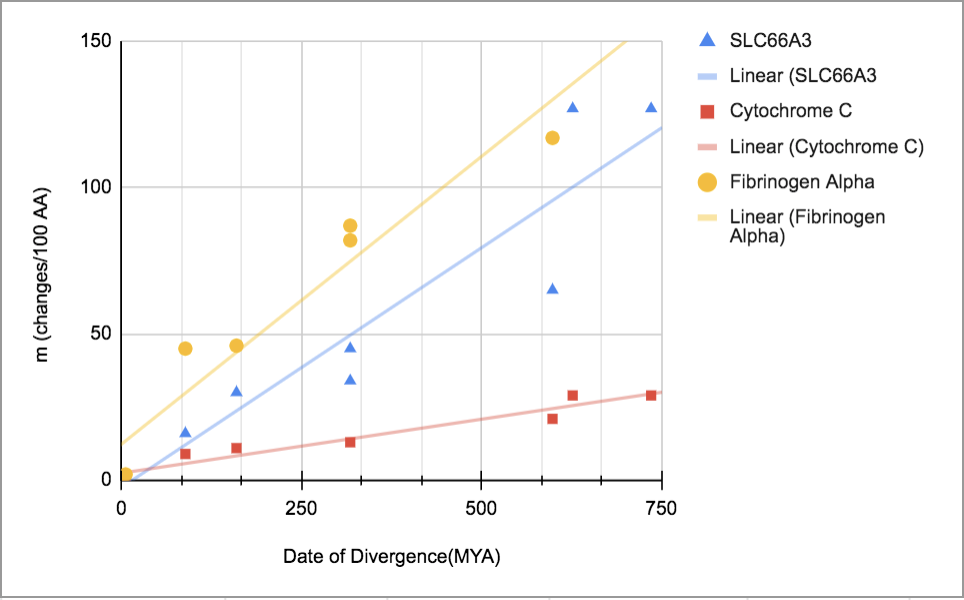
Date of divergence vs corrected divergence of SLC66A3 orthologs compared to cytochrome c and fibrinogen alpha.

=== Orthologs ===
SLC66A3 was present in the common ancestor of animals and is found in all animals but not fungi.

Genus, Species	Common Name	Taxonomic Group	Divergence date from humans (MYA)	accession number	Sequence Length(AA)	Sequence Identity(%)
Homo sapiens	Human	Primates	0	NP_689604.1	202	100
Mus musculus	Mouse	Rodentia	89	NP_766162.2	202	85
Phascolarctos cinereus	Koala	Marsupialia	160	XP_020841056.1	203	74
Anolis carolinensis	Green anole	Squamata	318	XP_003215467.1	202	64
Gallus gallus	Chicken	Galliformes	318	XP_040524789.1	201	71
Danio rerio	Zebrafish	Cypriniformes	433	NP_001004615.1	203	59
Electrophorus electricus	Electric eel	Gymnotiformes	433	XP_026863988.2	203	58
Callorhinchus milii	Elephant shark	Chimaera	465	XP_007895274.1	218	59
Petromyzon marinus	Sea lamprey	Petromyzontiformes	599	XP_032825995.1	201	52
Crassostrea gigas	Pacific oyster	Ostreida	736	XP_034312411.1	208	36
Drosophila willistoni	Fruitfly	Diptera	736	XP_002074377.2	220	34
Owenia fusiformis	Tube worm	Canalipalpata	736	CAC9661908.1	233	29
Lytechinus variegatus	Variegated sea urchin	Temnopleuroida	627	XP_041484893.1	224	29
Asterias rubens	Common starfish	Forcipulatida	627	XP_033644897.1	213	28
Amphimedon queenslandica	Sponge	Haplosclerida	777	XP_019856231.1	221	26
