= Y-27632 =

Names
- IUPAC name (1R,4r)-4-((R)-1-Aminoethyl)-N-(pyridin-4-yl)cyclohexanecarboxamide

Identifiers
CAS Number	146986-50-7
3D model (JSmol)	Interactive image
ChEBI	CHEBI:75393
ChEMBL	ChEMBL2218937
ChemSpider	20016532
DrugBank	DB08756
ECHA InfoCard	100.149.247
IUPHAR/BPS	5290
PubChem CID	448042
UNII	0X370ROP6H
CompTox Dashboard (EPA)	DTXSID7043740
- InChI: InChI=1S/C14H21N3O/c1-10(15)11-2-4-12(5-3-11)14(18)17-13-6-8-16-9-7-13/h6-12H,2-5,15H2,1H3,(H,16,17,18)/t10-,11-,12-/m1/s1 Key: IYOZTVGMEWJPKR-IJLUTSLNSA-N; InChI=1/C14H21N3O/c1-10(15)11-2-4-12(5-3-11)14(18)17-13-6-8-16-9-7-13/h6-12H,2-5,15H2,1H3,(H,16,17,18)/t10-,11-,12-/m1/s1 Key: IYOZTVGMEWJPKR-IJLUTSLNBP
- SMILES: O=C([C@H]1CC[C@@]([C@H](N)C)([H])CC1)NC2=CC=NC=C2

Properties
Chemical formula	C_{14}H_{21}N_{3}O
Molar mass	247.342 g·mol^{−1}
- Except where otherwise noted, data are given for materials in their standard state (at 25 °C [77 °F], 100 kPa). verify (what is ?) Infobox references

Y-27632 is a biochemical tool used in the study of the rho-associated protein kinase (ROCK) signaling pathways. Y-27632 selectively inhibits p160ROCK, although it does inhibit other protein kinases such as PKCs at higher concentrations.

It has been studied for its effects on corneal endothelial cells (CECs) and cardiac stem cells (CSCs).

The substance has been used as part of a chemical cocktail to turn old and senescent human cells back into young ones (as measured by transcriptomic age), without turning them all the way back into undifferentiated stem cells.

A mixture of methylcellulose (1%), ethylene glycol (10%), dimethyl sulfoxide (10%), and Y-27632 (10 μM), termed MEDY, has been shown to be an effective cryopreservation reagent for brain tissue, enabling tissue to resume growth and function after freezing using liquid nitrogen.
