= PPP1R12A =

Protein-coding gene in the species Homo sapiens

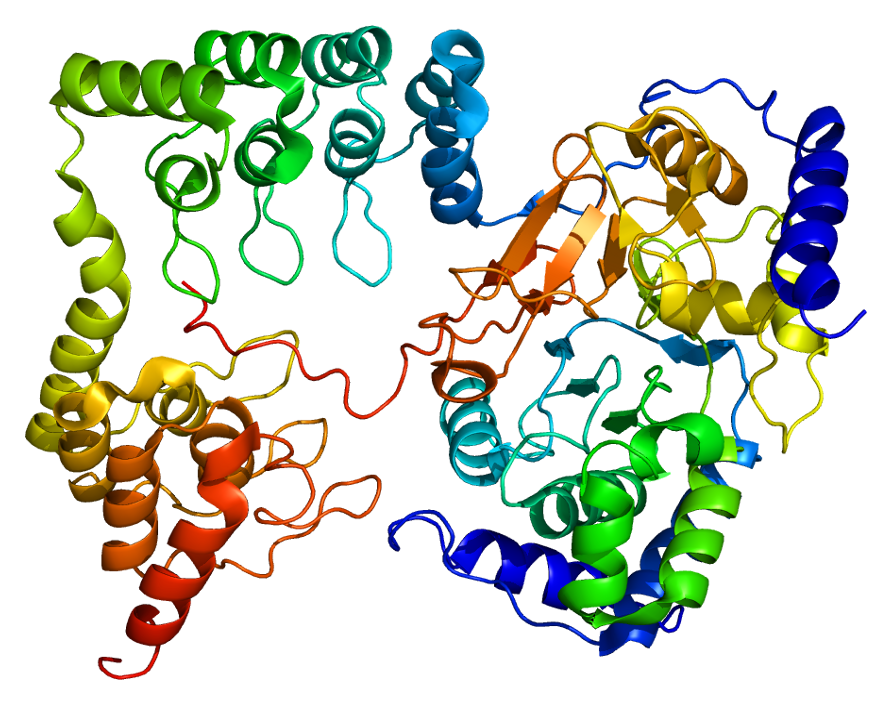

Identifiers
- Aliases: PPP1R12A, M130, MBS, MYPT1, protein phosphatase 1 regulatory subunit 12A, GUBS
- External IDs: OMIM: 602021; MGI: 1309528; GeneCards: PPP1R12A
Available structures
PDB	Ortholog search: PDBe RCSB
PDB	List of PDB id codes 2KJY, 2MXR, 5HUZ

Gene location (Human)
Chr.	Chromosome 12 (human)
Band	12q21.2-q21.31	Start	79,773,563 bp
Band	12q21.2-q21.31	End	79,935,460 bp

Gene location (Mouse)
Chr.	Chromosome 10 (mouse)
Band	10 D1|10 56.33 cM	Start	107,998,054 bp
Band	10 D1|10 56.33 cM	End	108,120,336 bp
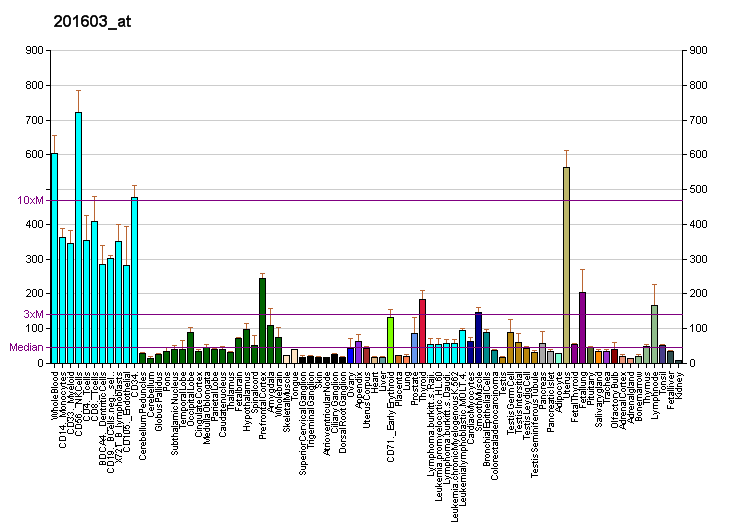

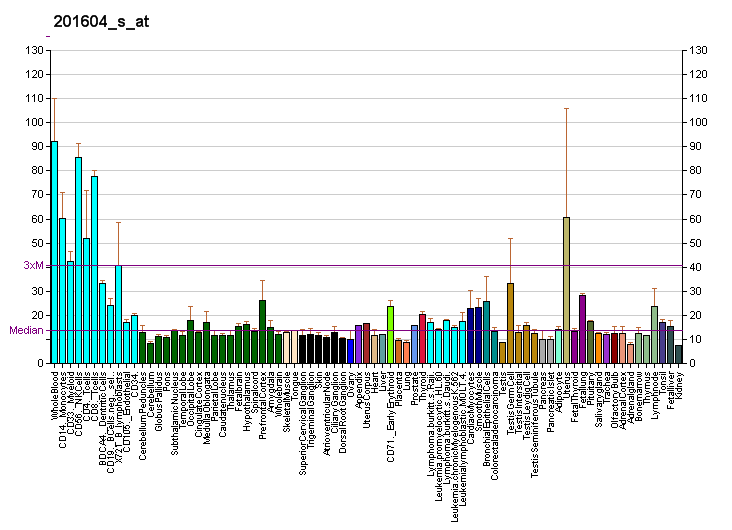

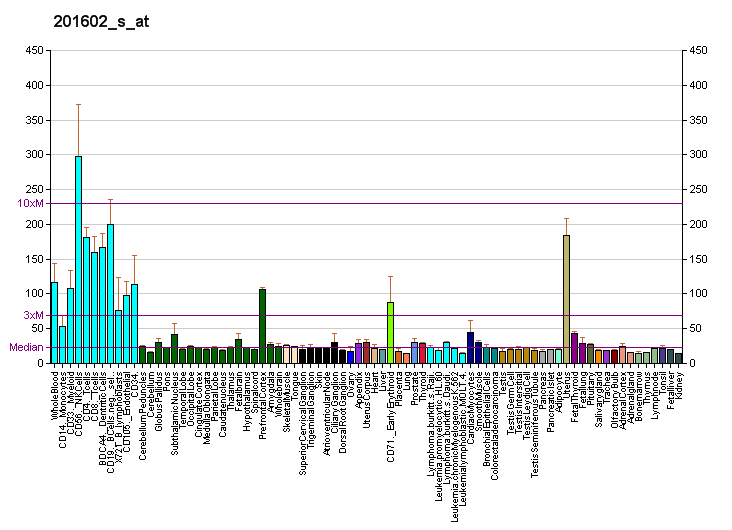
RNA expression pattern
Bgee	Human / Mouse (ortholog); Top expressed in: Achilles tendon; sural nerve; saphenous vein; tail of epididymis; epithelium of colon; popliteal artery; tibial arteries; urethra; right coronary artery; vena cava / Top expressed in: ascending aorta; aortic valve; conjunctival fornix; zygote; secondary oocyte; iris; otolith organ; primary oocyte; utricle; hand; More reference expression data
BioGPS	More reference expression data
Gene ontology
Molecular function	enzyme inhibitor activity; 14-3-3 protein binding; signal transducer activity; protein binding; protein kinase binding; phosphatase regulator activity
Cellular component	centrosome; focal adhesion; nucleoplasm; Z discdkac; PTW/PP1 phosphatase complex; actin cytoskeleton; contractile fiber; A band; kinetochore; cytoplasm; cytosol; cytoskeleton
Biological process	regulation of nucleocytoplasmic transport; positive regulation of myosin-light-chain-phosphatase activity; negative regulation of catalytic activity; regulation of cell adhesion; G2/M transition of mitotic cell cycle; regulation of myosin-light-chain-phosphatase activity; regulation of establishment of endothelial barrier; positive regulation of transcription by RNA polymerase II; signal transduction; protein dephosphorylation; mitotic cell cycle; centrosome cycle
Sources:Amigo / QuickGO
Orthologs
Databases	NCBI: entry; OMA: entry
Species	Human	Mouse
Entrez	4659	17931
Ensembl	ENSG00000058272	ENSMUSG00000019907
UniProt	O14974	Q9DBR7
RefSeq (mRNA)	NM_001143885; NM_001143886; NM_001244990; NM_001244992; NM_002480	NM_027892; NM_001368736; NM_001368737
RefSeq (protein)	NP_001137357; NP_001137358; NP_001231919; NP_001231921; NP_002471	NP_082168; NP_001355665; NP_001355666
Location (UCSC)	Chr 12: 79.77 – 79.94 Mb	Chr 10: 108 – 108.12 Mb
PubMed search
- Wikidata
View/Edit Human	View/Edit Mouse

Protein phosphatase 1 regulatory subunit 12A is an enzyme that in humans is encoded by the PPP1R12A gene.

Myosin phosphatase target subunit 1, which is also called the myosin-binding subunit of myosin phosphatase, is one of the subunits of myosin phosphatase. Myosin phosphatase regulates the interaction of actin and myosin downstream of the guanosine triphosphatase Rho. The small guanosine triphosphatase Rho is implicated in myosin light chain (MLC) phosphorylation, which results in contraction of smooth muscle and interaction of actin and myosin in nonmuscle cells. The guanosine triphosphate (GTP)-bound, active form of RhoA (GTP.RhoA) specifically interacted with the myosin-binding subunit (MBS) of myosin phosphatase, which regulates the extent of phosphorylation of MLC. Rho-associated kinase (Rho-kinase), which is activated by GTP. RhoA, phosphorylated MBS and consequently inactivated myosin phosphatase. Overexpression of RhoA or activated RhoA in NIH 3T3 cells increased phosphorylation of MBS and MLC. Thus, Rho appears to inhibit myosin phosphatase through the action of Rho-kinase.

== Interactions ==
PPP1R12A has been shown to interact with Interleukin 16.
