= Lim kinase =

Actin-binding kinases

The LIM (LIN-11, Isl-1, MEC-3) kinases are a family of actin-binding kinases that phosphorylate members of the ADF/cofilin family of actin binding and filament severing proteins. The LIM kinase family is made up of two proteins: LIM kinase-1 (LIMK1) and LIM kinase-2 (LIMK2)

ADF/cofilin are the only substrates yet identified for the LIM kinases. LIM kinases directly phosphorylate and inactivate members of the cofilin family, resulting in stabilization of filamentous (F)-actin. Lim kinases are activated by signaling through small GTPases of the Rho family. Upstream, LIMK1 is regulated by Pak1, and LIMK2 by the Rho-dependent kinase ROCK. Lim Kinases are activated by PAK (p21-activated kinase). Recent work indicates that LIMK activity is also modulated by HIV-1 viral proteins.

There are approximately 40 known eukaryotic LIM proteins, so named for the LIM domains they contain. LIM domains are highly conserved cysteine-rich structures containing 2 zinc fingers. Although zinc fingers usually function by binding to DNA or RNA, the LIM motif probably mediates protein–protein interactions. LIM kinase-1 and LIM kinase-2 belong to a small subfamily with a unique combination of 2 N-terminal LIM motifs and a C-terminal protein kinase domain. LIMK1 is likely to be a component of an intracellular signaling pathway and may be involved in brain development. LIMK1 hemizygosity is implicated in the impaired visuospatial constructive cognition of Williams syndrome.

== Role in cell cycle progression ==
LIM kinase family proteins regulate actin polymerization through the phosphorylation of cofilin at Ser-3, inactivating its actin-depolymerizing activity. LIMK proteins are activated via phosphorylation at Thr508 (LIMK1) and Thr 505 (LIMK2). LIMK1 and LIMK2 are phosphorylated and activated when microtubule assembly is disrupted due to external stress. Due to differences in subcellular localization and regulation, LIMK1 and LIMK2 are believed to serve distinct roles in the progression of mitosis. Knockout experiments have found that neither LIM kinase is necessary for the full development of an organism, though impaired synaptic function, impaired spermatogenesis, and abnormal spine morphology were observed. As a result, the LIM kinases are hypothesized to take part in a checkpoint for aberrant spindle assembly due to external stress. This is supported by LIMK2 deficient mice displayed heightened abnormal sperm production when subjected to heat-stress. LIMK1 and LIMK2 are not believed to serve a critical role in normal cell division.

=== LIMK1 ===
==== subcellular localization ====
LIMK1 has been found to localize to cell-cell adhesion sites during interphase and prophase, the spindle poles during prometaphase and anaphase, and the contractile ring during telophase.

==== mitotic spindle regulation ====
LIMK1 over expression induces multinucleate cells, suggesting a role in contractile ring assembly/disassembly during cytokinesis. LIMK1 has also been found to regulate microtubule stability through the phosphorylation of p25, inhibiting tubing polymerization and causing microtubules to disassemble.

=== LIMK2 ===
==== subcellular localization ====
LIMK2 is diffused throughout the cytoplasm during interphase, and localizes to the mitotic spindle during metaphase and early anaphase before being redistributed to the spindle midzone, after which it is co-localized with midzone microtubules for the duration of anaphase and telophase. LIMK2 does not colocalize with actin or actin or cofilin during anaphase to telophase, suggesting that LIMK2 may play a regulatory role in cytokinesis, though it is unknown if LIMK2 regulates any spindle midzone other than cofilin.

==== mitotic spindle regulation ====
LIMK2 is not active during the normal cell cycle, and is only phosphorylated and activated in the event of microtubule disruption. LIMK2 deficiency leads to abnormal mitotic spindle formation, thought the exact molecular mechanism by which this occurs and how LIMK2 regulates mitosis remains unknown.

== Role outside cell cycle progression ==
LIMK1 is highly expressed throughout late stage mammalian development, particularly within epithelial and neural tissues. Levels of LIMK1 in the heart, kidneys, and lungs vary depending on developmental stage. While also found in neuronal tissue, LIMK2 is predominantly expressed in epithelia. The presence of multiple splice variants makes it particularly difficult to full determine LIM kinase expression patterns. LIM kinases serve as downstream effectors within the non-canonical nerve growth factor, semaphoric, and bone morphogenic protein (BMP) pathways.

=== dendritic spine morphogenesis ===
LIMK1 plays a role in the development and morphology of dendritic spines through the Smad-independent BMP pathway. BMPs bind to the heterodimeric complexes of type-1 and type-2 Ser/Thr kinase receptors, leading to phosphorylation and activation of type-1 receptors by type-2 receptors. BMP type-2 receptors (BMPRII) contain a 600 amino acid long cytoplasmic domain that is capable of interacting with and suppressing the activation of LIMK1 by PAK. LIMK1 activity can be restored via dissociation from BMPRII, caused by BMP4 binding. Thus LIMK1 serves a crucial role in the regulation of actin dynamics during dendrite extension.

=== spinal and neural development ===
Knock out experiments in both mice and Drosophila melanogaster suggest that LIMK1 plays a significant role in neuron differentiation and normal synaptic development, particularly in neuromuscular and olfactory synapses. LIMK1 may achieve regulation of synapse expansion through arresting NMJ synapse growth by stabilizing the actin cytoskeleton. LIMK1 also contributes to normal spinal development; knockout of the gene caused abnormal spine morphology, and rescue experiments have determined that spinal actin polymerization, stability, and structural plasticity is dependent on palmitoylation of LIMK1. Spine density is influenced by regulation of LIMK1 by ErB4, which interacts with the LIM domain via the transmembrane ligand neuregulin.

=== gonadal cell development ===
Knock out studies of LIMK2 in mice led to impaired spermatogenesis and elevated rates of apoptosis within spermatocytes, with rates of both increasing with exposure to external stress. This correlated with the absence of tLIMK2, an isoform of LIMK2 specific to the testis. In the absence of tLIMK2, external stress led to the generation of inclusions by over accumulation of ADF/cofilin. Given the fragile nature of spermatogenic cells, it is hypothesized that tLIMK2 plays a vital role in the process of spermatogenesis by regulating microtubule assembly in response to external stress such as heat, radiation, and toxins in order to prevent cell death.

LIMK1 is a crucial component in the activation of signaling pathways responsible for acrosomal exocytosis. Inhibition of LIMK1 in mice during capacitation resulted in decreased actin polymerization and a severe reduction in the percentage of sperm that underwent acrosomal exocytosis. While it is unknown whether this is due to alteration of actin-reliant events in exocytosis or failure to activate unknown LIMK1 target proteins, LIMK1 is vital for the proper development of sperm and their ability to successfully fertilize oocytes.

== Role in cancer ==
LIM kinases participate in several non-canonical signaling pathways whose dysregulation can lead to tumorigenesis. LIM kinases have been found to be unregulated in melanoma, gastric, breast, and prostate cancer. Overexpression of LIMK1 in particular has been associated with heightened risk of metastasis, leading to it being considered as a potential drug target to reduce cancer motility. Overexpressed LMK1 also leads to increased tumor size and TNM stage progression.

LIMK2 activity has been linked with resistance to microtubule destabilizing drugs. Neuroblastoma cells resistant to these drugs were found to contain elevated levels of LIMK2; knocking out LIMK2 in these cells restored partial sensitivity to the drugs. Overexpression of LIMK2 in SH-EP cells resulted in resistance to vincristine induced apoptosis. These findings have led to the consideration of LIMK2 as a potential drug target in order to improve treatment of childhood neuroblastoma otherwise resistant to microtubule destabilizing drugs.
