= ROCK2 =

Protein-coding gene in the species Homo sapiens

Identifiers
- Aliases: ROCK2, ROCK-II, Rho associated coiled-coil containing protein kinase 2
- External IDs: OMIM: 604002; MGI: 107926; GeneCards: ROCK2
Available structures
| PDB | Ortholog search: PDBe RCSB |
| PDB | List of PDB id codes 4L6Q, 4WOT |
Enzyme activity
| EC # | BRENDA | ExPASy | KEGG | MetaCyc |
|---|---|---|---|---|
| 2.7.11.39 | ↗ | ↗ | ↗ | ↗ |

Gene location (Human)
| Chr. | Chromosome 2 (human) |
| Band | 2p25.1 | Start | 11,179,759 bp |
| Band | 2p25.1 | End | 11,348,330 bp |

Gene location (Mouse)
| Chr. | Chromosome 12 (mouse) |
| Band | 12|12 A1.1 | Start | 16,894,895 bp |
| Band | 12|12 A1.1 | End | 16,987,823 bp |
RNA expression pattern
| Bgee | Human / Mouse (ortholog); Top expressed in: Achilles tendon; epithelium of colon; middle temporal gyrus; thoracic diaphragm; biceps brachii; superficial temporal artery; Skeletal muscle tissue of biceps brachii; Brodmann area 10; cerebellar vermis; Brodmann area 46 / Top expressed in: tail of embryo; aortic valve; ascending aorta; muscle of thigh; dentate gyrus of hippocampal formation granule cell; genital tubercle; superior frontal gyrus; triceps brachii muscle; primary visual cortex; thoracic diaphragm; More reference expression data |
| BioGPS | n/a |
Gene ontology
| Molecular function | transferase activity; nucleotide binding; protein kinase activity; structural molecule activity; metal ion binding; kinase activity; protein serine/threonine kinase activity; protein binding; ATP binding; Rho-dependent protein serine/threonine kinase activity; RNA binding; tau protein binding; tau-protein kinase activity |
| Cellular component | cytoplasm; centrosome; membrane; plasma membrane; microtubule organizing center; cytoplasmic ribonucleoprotein granule; cytoskeleton; nucleus; cytosol; intracellular anatomical structure |
| Biological process | smooth muscle contraction; positive regulation of protein phosphorylation; intracellular signal transduction; regulation of actin cytoskeleton organization; centrosome duplication; phosphorylation; rhythmic process; ephrin receptor signaling pathway; cellular response to testosterone stimulus; cytokinesis; positive regulation of centrosome duplication; regulation of stress fiber assembly; regulation of cell motility; positive regulation of endothelial cell migration; protein phosphorylation; negative regulation of bicellular tight junction assembly; vascular endothelial growth factor receptor signaling pathway; positive regulation of gene expression; regulation of cell adhesion; regulation of circadian rhythm; Rho protein signal transduction; regulation of focal adhesion assembly; negative regulation of angiogenesis; regulation of keratinocyte differentiation; negative regulation of myosin-light-chain-phosphatase activity; I-kappaB kinase/NF-kappaB signaling; regulation of establishment of cell polarity; cortical actin cytoskeleton organization; regulation of establishment of endothelial barrier; actin cytoskeleton organization; protein localization to plasma membrane; G protein-coupled receptor signaling pathway; aortic valve morphogenesis; positive regulation of cardiac muscle hypertrophy; peptidyl-serine phosphorylation; peptidyl-threonine phosphorylation; positive regulation of cell migration; positive regulation of connective tissue growth factor production; positive regulation of MAPK cascade; regulation of protein metabolic process; positive regulation of stress fiber assembly; negative regulation of biomineral tissue development; response to transforming growth factor beta; positive regulation of fibroblast growth factor production; regulation of angiotensin-activated signaling pathway; negative regulation of protein localization to lysosome; positive regulation of amyloid-beta formation; positive regulation of aspartic-type endopeptidase activity involved in amyloid precursor protein catabolic process; positive regulation of protein localization to early endosome; positive regulation of amyloid precursor protein catabolic process; positive regulation of connective tissue replacement; response to angiotensin; response to ischemia; negative regulation of gene expression; regulation of nervous system process; negative regulation of nitric oxide biosynthetic process; mRNA destabilization; blood vessel diameter maintenance; regulation of cellular response to hypoxia; cellular response to acetylcholine; mitotic cytokinesis; actomyosin structure organization; embryonic morphogenesis; regulation of cell junction assembly |
Sources:Amigo / QuickGO
Orthologs
| Databases | NCBI: entry; OMA: entry |
| Species | Human | Mouse |
| Entrez | 9475 | 19878 |
| Ensembl | ENSG00000134318 | ENSMUSG00000020580 |
| UniProt | O75116 | P70336 |
| RefSeq (mRNA) | NM_004850; NM_001321643 | NM_009072 |
| RefSeq (protein) | NP_001308572; NP_004841 | NP_033098 |
| Location (UCSC) | Chr 2: 11.18 – 11.35 Mb | Chr 12: 16.89 – 16.99 Mb |
| PubMed search |
- Wikidata
| View/Edit Human | View/Edit Mouse |

Rho associated coiled-coil containing protein kinase 2 is a protein that in humans is encoded by the ROCK2 gene. Fasudil is an inhibitor of ROCK protein.

== Function ==
The protein encoded by this gene is a serine/threonine kinase that regulates cytokinesis, smooth muscle contraction, the formation of actin stress fibers and focal adhesions, and the activation of the c-fos serum response element. This protein, which is an isozyme of ROCK1 is a target for the small GTPase Rho.
