= Rho-associated protein kinase =

Protein family

ROCK
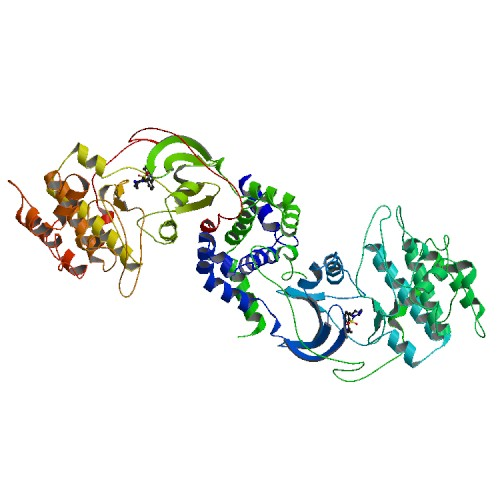
- Crystal structure of human ROCK I

Identifiers
- Symbol: Rho-associated protein kinase
- Alt. symbols: Rho-associated, coiled-coil-containing protein kinase
- NCBI gene: 579202

Other data
- EC number: 2.7.11.1

Rho-associated protein kinase or Rho-associated coiled-coil kinase (ROCK) is a kinase belonging to the AGC (PKA/ PKG/PKC) family of serine-threonine specific protein kinases. It is involved mainly in regulating the shape and movement of cells by acting on the cytoskeleton.

ROCKs (ROCK1 and ROCK2) occur in mammals (human, rat, mouse, cow), zebrafish, Xenopus, invertebrates (C. elegans, mosquito, Drosophila) and chicken. Human ROCK1 has a molecular mass of 158 kDa and is a major downstream effector of the small GTPase RhoA. Mammalian ROCK consists of a kinase domain, a coiled-coil region and a Pleckstrin homology (PH) domain, which reduces the kinase activity of ROCKs by an autoinhibitory intramolecular fold if RhoA-GTP is not present.

Rat ROCKs were discovered as the first effectors of Rho and they induce the formation of stress fibers and focal adhesions by phosphorylating MLC (myosin light chain). Due to this phosphorylation, the actin binding of myosin II and, thus, the contractility increases. Two mouse ROCK isoforms ROCK1 and ROCK2 have been identified. ROCK1 is mainly expressed in the lung, liver, spleen, kidney and testis. However, ROCK2 is distributed mostly in the brain and heart.

Protein kinase C and Rho-associated protein kinase are involved in regulating calcium ion intake; these calcium ions, in turn stimulate a myosin light chain kinase, forcing a contraction. Rho-associated protein kinase are serine or threonine kinases that determine the calcium sensitivity in smooth muscle cells.

== Function ==
Role and regulation of ROCK

ROCK plays a role in a wide range of different cellular phenomena, as ROCK is a downstream effector protein of the small GTPase Rho, which is one of the major regulators of the cytoskeleton.

1. ROCK is a key regulator of actin organization and thus a regulator of cell migration as follows:

Different substrates can be phosphorylated by ROCKs, including LIM kinase, myosin light chain (MLC) and MLC phosphatase. These substrates, once phosphorylated, regulate actin filament organization and contractility as follows:

- Amount of actin filaments

ROCK inhibits the depolymerization of actin filaments indirectly: ROCK phosphorylates and activates LIM kinase, which in turn phosphorylates ADF/cofilin, thereby inactivating its actin-depolymerization activity. This results in the stabilization of actin filaments and an increase in their numbers. Thus, over time actin monomers that are needed to continue actin polymerization for migration become limited. The increased stable actin filaments and the loss of actin monomers contribute to a reduction of cell migration.

- Cellular contractility

ROCK also regulates cell migration by promoting cellular contraction and thus cell-substratum contacts. ROCK increases the activity of the motor protein myosin II by two different mechanisms:

- Firstly, phosphorylation of the myosin light chain (MLC) increases the myosin II ATPase activity. Thus several bundled and active myosins, which are asynchronously active on several actin filaments, move actin filaments against each other, resulting in the net shortenting of actin fibres.
- Secondly, ROCK inactivates MLC phosphatase, leading to increased levels of phosphorylated MLC.

Thus in both cases, ROCK activation by Rho induces the formation of actin stress fibers, actin filament bundles of opposing polarity, containing myosin II, tropomyosin, caldesmon and MLC-kinase, and consequently of focal contacts, which are immature integrin-based adhesion points with the extracellular substrate.

2. Other functions and targets

- RhoA-GTP stimulates the phospholipid phosphatase activity of PTEN (phosphatase and tensin homologue), a human tumor suppressor protein. This stimulation seems to depend on ROCK. In this way, PTEN is important to prevent uncontrolled cell division as is exhibited in cancer cells.
- ROCK plays an important role in cell cycle control, it seems to inhibit the premature separation of the two centrioles in G1, and is proposed to be required for contraction of the cleavage furrow, which is necessary for the completion of cytokinesis.
- ROCKs also seem to antagonize the insulin signaling pathway, resulting in a reduction of cell size and influence cell fate.
- ROCKS play a role in membrane blebbing, a morphological change seen in cells committed to apoptosis. The pro-apoptotic protease, caspase 3, activates ROCK kinase activity by cleaving the C-terminal PH domain. As a result, the autoinhibitory intramolecular fold of ROCK is abolished. ROCK also regulates MLC phosphorylation and actomyosin contractility, which regulate membrane blebbing.
- ROCKs contribute to neurite retraction by inducing growth cone collapse by activating actomyosin contractility. It is also possible that phosphorylation of collapsin response mediator protein-2 (CRMP2) by ROCK inhibits CRPM2 function of promoting axon outgrowth, resulting in growth cone collapse.
- ROCKs regulate cell-cell adhesion: Loss of ROCK activity seems to lead to loss of tight junction integrity in endothelial cells. In epithelial cells inhibition of ROCK seems to decrease tight junction integrity. Active ROCK in these cells seems to stimulate the disruption of E-Cadherin-mediated cell-cell contacts by activating actomyosin contractility.

3. Other ROCK targets

- NHE1 (a sodium hydrogen exchanger, involved in focal adhesions and actin organisation)
- intermediate filament proteins: Vimentin, GFAP (glial fibrillaric acidic protein), NF-L (neurofilament L protein)
- F-actin binding proteins: Adducin, EF-1&alpha (elongation factor, translation co-factor), MARCKS (myristylated alanine-rich C kinase substrate), Caponin (unknown function), and ERM (involved in linkage of the actin cytoskelton to the plasma membrane).

== Homologues ==
Rho-associated, coiled-coil-containing protein kinase 1

Identifiers
- Symbol: ROCK1
- NCBI gene: 6093
- HGNC: 10251
- OMIM: 601702
- RefSeq: NM_005406
- UniProt: Q13464
Search for
- Structures: Swiss-model
- Domains: InterPro

Rho-associated, coiled-coil-containing protein kinase 2

Identifiers
- Symbol: ROCK2
- NCBI gene: 9475
- HGNC: 10252
- OMIM: 604002
- RefSeq: NM_004850
- UniProt: O75116
Search for
- Structures: Swiss-model
- Domains: InterPro

The two mouse ROCK isoforms, ROCK1 and ROCK2, have high homology. They have 65% amino acid sequences in common and 92% homology within their kinase domains.

ROCKs are homologous to other metazoan kinases such as myotonic dystrophy kinase (DMPK), DMPK-related cell division control protein 42 (Cdc42)-binding kinases (MRCK) and citron kinase. All of these kinases are composed of a N-terminal kinase domain, a coiled-coil structure and other functional motifs at the C-terminus

== Regulation ==
ROCK is a downstream effector molecule of the Rho GTPase Rho that increases ROCK kinase activity when bound to it.

=== Autoinhibition ===
ROCK activity is regulated by the disruption of an intramolecular autoinhibition. In general, the structure of ROCK proteins consists of an N-terminal kinase domain, a coiled-coiled region and a PH domain containing a cystein-rich domain (CRD) at the C-terminal. A Rho-binding domain (RBD) is located in close proximity just in front of the PH domain.

The kinase activity is inhibited by the intramolecular binding between the C-terminal cluster of RBD domain and the PH domain to the N-terminal kinase domain of ROCK. Thus, the kinase activity is off when ROCK is intramolecularly folded. The kinase activity is switched on when Rho-GTP binds to the Rho-binding domain of ROCK, disrupting the autoinhibitory interaction within ROCK, which liberates the kinase domain because ROCK is then no longer intramolecularly folded.

=== Other regulators ===
It has also been shown that Rho is not the only activator of ROCK. ROCK can also be regulated by lipids, in particular arachidonic acid, and protein oligomerization, which induces N-terminal transphosphorylation.

== Disease ==
Research over the past two decades has shown that ROCK signaling plays an important role in many diseases including cardiovascular disease, neurodegenerative diseases such as Alzheimer's disease, Parkinson's disease, and amyotrophic lateral sclerosis, and cancer. For example, ROCK has been hypothesized to play an important role in the pleiotropic effects of statins. ROCK1/2 along with MRCKα/β kinases have been implicated in the plasticity of cancer cell migration, the phenomenon which bestows survival advantage to the cancer cells during drug treatments (drug resistance).

Researchers are developing ROCK inhibitors such as RKI-1447 for treating various diseases including cancer. For example, such drugs have potential to prevent cancer from spreading by blocking cell migration, stopping cancer cells from spreading into neighboring tissue.

== See also ==
- ROCK1
