= ROCK1 =

Protein

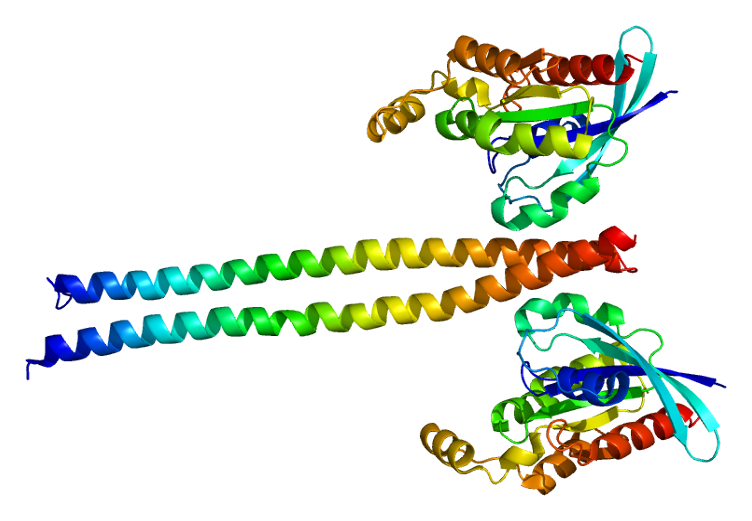

Identifiers
- Aliases: ROCK1, P160ROCK, ROCK-I, Rho associated coiled-coil containing protein kinase 1
- External IDs: OMIM: 601702; MGI: 107927; GeneCards: ROCK1
Available structures
PDB	Ortholog search: PDBe RCSB
PDB	List of PDB id codes 1S1C, 2ESM, 2ETK, 2ETR, 2V55, 3D9V, 3NCZ, 3NDM, 3O0Z, 3TV7, 3TWJ, 3V8S, 4L2W, 4W7P, 4YVC, 4YVE, 5BML
Enzyme activity
EC #	BRENDA	ExPASy	KEGG	MetaCyc
2.7.11.39	↗	↗	↗	↗

Gene location (Human)
Chr.	Chromosome 18 (human)
Band	18q11.1	Start	20,946,906 bp
Band	18q11.1	End	21,111,813 bp

Gene location (Mouse)
Chr.	Chromosome 18 (mouse)
Band	18|18 A1	Start	10,064,401 bp
Band	18|18 A1	End	10,182,045 bp
RNA expression pattern
Bgee	Human / Mouse (ortholog); Top expressed in: Achilles tendon; popliteal artery; tibial arteries; monocyte; right coronary artery; bone marrow cell; left coronary artery; Descending thoracic aorta; ascending aorta; epithelium of colon / Top expressed in: tunica media of zone of aorta; Rostral migratory stream; zygote; secondary oocyte; ciliary body; ascending aorta; primary oocyte; lacrimal gland; aortic valve; left lung lobe; More reference expression data
BioGPS	n/a
Gene ontology
Molecular function	transferase activity; protein kinase activity; nucleotide binding; metal ion binding; kinase activity; protein serine/threonine kinase activity; protein binding; ATP binding; tau protein binding; tau-protein kinase activity; Rho-dependent protein serine/threonine kinase activity
Cellular component	cytoplasm; cytosol; Golgi apparatus; cell projection; membrane; ruffle; Golgi membrane; plasma membrane; bleb; centriole; cytoskeleton; lamellipodium; extracellular region; secretory granule lumen; cytoplasmic stress granule; amyloid-beta complex
Biological process	negative regulation of neuron apoptotic process; leukocyte cell-cell adhesion; smooth muscle contraction; myoblast migration; intracellular signal transduction; regulation of actin cytoskeleton organization; phosphorylation; ephrin receptor signaling pathway; bleb assembly; negative regulation of protein binding; regulation of actin filament-based process; regulation of stress fiber assembly; regulation of cell motility; protein phosphorylation; negative regulation of bicellular tight junction assembly; vascular endothelial growth factor receptor signaling pathway; regulation of cell adhesion; Rho protein signal transduction; membrane to membrane docking; leukocyte tethering or rolling; regulation of focal adhesion assembly; negative regulation of angiogenesis; regulation of keratinocyte differentiation; positive regulation of focal adhesion assembly; negative regulation of myosin-light-chain-phosphatase activity; I-kappaB kinase/NF-kappaB signaling; regulation of establishment of cell polarity; cortical actin cytoskeleton organization; apical constriction; regulation of establishment of endothelial barrier; actin cytoskeleton organization; leukocyte migration; signal transduction; regulation of cytoskeleton organization; apoptotic process; neutrophil degranulation; execution phase of apoptosis; protein localization to plasma membrane; G protein-coupled receptor signaling pathway; aortic valve morphogenesis; regulation of autophagy; positive regulation of autophagy; positive regulation of cardiac muscle hypertrophy; positive regulation of gene expression; peptidyl-serine phosphorylation; neuron projection development; positive regulation of MAPK cascade; regulation of neuron differentiation; negative regulation of membrane protein ectodomain proteolysis; negative regulation of biomineral tissue development; response to transforming growth factor beta; regulation of angiotensin-activated signaling pathway; neuron projection arborization; positive regulation of amyloid-beta clearance; regulation of synaptic vesicle endocytosis; regulation of amyloid-beta formation; negative regulation of amyloid-beta formation; negative regulation of amyloid precursor protein catabolic process; positive regulation of connective tissue replacement; response to angiotensin; mRNA destabilization; blood vessel diameter maintenance; mitotic cytokinesis; peptidyl-threonine phosphorylation; actomyosin structure organization; embryonic morphogenesis; regulation of cell junction assembly
Sources:Amigo / QuickGO
Orthologs
Databases	NCBI: entry; OMA: entry
Species	Human	Mouse
Entrez	6093	19877
Ensembl	ENSG00000067900	ENSMUSG00000024290
UniProt	Q13464	P70335
RefSeq (mRNA)	NM_005406	NM_009071
RefSeq (protein)	NP_005397	NP_033097
Location (UCSC)	Chr 18: 20.95 – 21.11 Mb	Chr 18: 10.06 – 10.18 Mb
PubMed search
- Wikidata
View/Edit Human	View/Edit Mouse

ROCK1 is a protein serine/threonine kinase also known as rho-associated, coiled-coil-containing protein kinase 1. Other common names are ROKβ and P160ROCK. ROCK1 is a major downstream effector of the small GTPase RhoA and is a regulator of the actomyosin cytoskeleton which promotes contractile force generation. ROCK1 plays a role in cancer and in particular cell motility, metastasis, and angiogenesis.

== Gene and expression ==
ROCK1 is also the name of the gene that encodes the protein ROCK1, a serine/threonine kinase. ROCK1 is activated when bound to the GTP-bound form of RhoA. The human ROCK1 gene is located on human chromosome 18 with specific location of 18q11.1. The location of the base pair starts at 18,529,703 and ends at 18,691,812 bp and translates into 1354 amino acids.

ROCK1 has a ubiquitous tissue distribution, but subcellularly it is thought to colocalize with the centrosomes. This is consistent with its function as a key modulator of cell motility, tumor cell invasion, and actin cytoskeleton organization. In rats, ROCK1 is expressed in the lung, liver, spleen, kidney, and testis.

== Structure and regulation ==
The ROCK1 structure is a serine/threonine kinase with molecular weight of 158 kDa. It is a homodimer composed of a catalytic kinase domain (residues76-338) located at the amino or N-terminus of the protein, a coiled-coil region (residues 425-1100) containing the Rho-binding domain, and a pleckstrin-homology domain (residues 1118-1317) with a cysteine-rich domain. When a substrate is absent, ROCK1 is an autoinhibited loop structure. Enzyme activity of ROCK1 is inhibited when the pleckstrin-homology and Rho-binding domains in the C-terminus independently bind to the N-terminus kinase domain. When a substrate such as GTP-bound RhoA binds to the Rho-binding region of the coiled-coil domain, the interactions between the N-terminus and the C-terminus are disrupted, thus activating the protein. Cleavage of the C-terminal inhibitory domain by caspase-3 during apoptosis can also activate the kinase.

This view of autoinhibition released by RhoA binding has been challenged by low resolution electron microscopy data showing ROCK to be a constitutive linear dimer 120 nm in length. According to this new data ROCK does not need to be activated by RhoA or phosphorylation because it is always active, and whether ROCK will phosphorylate its substrates (e.g. myosin regulatory light chain) depends only on their subcellular localization.

There is one other isoform of ROCK known as ROCK2. ROCK2 is located at 2p24 and is highly homologous with ROCK1 with an overall amino acid sequence identity of 65%. The identity in the Rho-binding domain is 58% and approximately 92% in the kinase domain. The ROCK isoforms are encoded by two different identified genes and are ubiquitously expressed.

GTPase-RhoA binding can increase the activity of ROCK1 by 1.5-2-fold. Without RhoA binding, lipids such as arachidonic acid or sphingosine phosphorylcholine can increase ROCK1 activity 5- to 6-fold. These two lipids interact with the pleckstrin-homology domain, thus disrupting its ability to inhibit ROCK1. G-protein RhoE binds to the N-terminus of ROCK1 and inhibits its activity by preventing RhoA binding. Small G-proteins, Gem and Rad, have been shown to bind and inhibit ROCK1 function, but their mechanism of action is unclear.

== Substrates and interactions ==
ROCK1 phosphorylation sites are at RXXS/T or RXS/T. More than 15 ROCK1 substrates have been identified and activation from these substrates most often leads to actin filament formation and cytoskeleton rearrangements. MYPT-1 is involved in a pathway for smooth muscle contraction. When ROCK1 is activated by binding of GTPase RhoA it produces multiple signaling cascades. For example, RhoA is one of the downstream signaling cascades activated by vascular endothelial growth factor (VEGF). ROCK1 acts as a negative regulator of VEGF endothelial cell activation and angiogenesis. ROCK1 activation by RhoA also promotes stabilization of F-actin, phosphorylation of regulatory myosin light chain (MLC) and an increase in contractility, which plays a crucial role in tumor cell migration and metastasis. This activated ROCK1 also activates LIM kinase, which, phosphorylates cofilin, inhibiting its actin-depolymerizing activity. This depolymerization results in stabilization of actin filaments and decreased branching which promotes contraction.

Cardiac troponin is another ROCK1 substrate that upon phosphorylation causes reduction in tension in cardiac myocytes. ROCK1 also acts as a suppressor of inflammatory cell migration by regulating PTEN phosphorylation and stability.

== Function ==
ROCK1 has a diverse range of functions in the body. It is a key regulator of actin-myosin contraction, stability, and cell polarity. These contribute to many progresses such as regulation of morphology, gene transcription, proliferation, differentiation, apoptosis and oncogenic transformation. Other functions involve smooth muscle contraction, actin cytoskeleton organization, stress fiber and focal adhesion formation, neurite retraction, cell adhesion and motility. These functions are activated by phosphorylation of DAPK3, GFAP, LIMK1, LIMK2, MYL9/MLC2, PFN1 and PPP1R12A. Additionally, ROCK1 phosphorylates FHOD1 and acts synergistically with it to promote SRC-dependent non-apoptotic plasma membrane blebbing. It is also required for centrosome positioning and centrosome-dependent exit from mitosis.

== Interactions ==
ROCK1 has been shown to interact with:

- LIMK1,
- MLC,
- MYPT1,
- PFN2, and
- RHOA.

== Clinical significance ==
In humans, the main function of ROCK1 is actomyosin contractility. As mentioned before, this contributes to many proximal progresses such as regulation of morphology, motility, and cell–cell and cell–matrix adhesion. In addition, ROCK kinases influence more distal cellular processes including gene transcription, proliferation, differentiation, apoptosis and oncogenic transformation. Given this diverse range of functions, it is not surprising that ROCK1 has been implicated in numerous aspects of cancer.

=== Role in cancer ===
Recent studies have explored the role of ROCK1 in cancer with particular attention focused on cell motility, metastasis, and angiogenesis. Rho GTPases such as RhoA are highly involved in morphologic changes in cells. When a tumor progresses from invasive to metastatic form it requires that they undergo these dramatic morphologic changes. Therefore, increased expression of RhoA and its downstream effector ROCK1 is often observed in human cancers. These cancers are typically more invasive and metastatic phenotypes.

=== Angiogenesis ===
Increased expression of RhoA and ROCK1 in endothelial cell migration pathways can cause an increase in angiogenesis and metastatic behavior in tumor cells. It has been suggested that ROCK1 either regulates the expression of angiogenic factors or ROCK1 activation facilitates angiogenesis by increasing the plasticity of the tumor. By reducing the strength of cell-cell interactions and aiding the movement of tumor cells, ROCK1 may enable endothelial cells to penetrate the tumor mass more easily.

=== ROCK1 inhibitors in cancer therapy ===
ROCK1 inhibitors might be used in cancer therapy for:

- targeting of stromal rather than tumor cells
- concomitant blocking of ROCK and proteasome activity in K‐Ras‐driven lung cancers
- treating haematological malignancies such as chronic myelogenous leukemia (CML)

ROCK1 inhibition for cancer treatment has not been approved for standard therapy use. Y27632 and Fasudil are examples of ROCK1 inhibitors. Both inhibit ROCK1 by competing with ATP for the kinase activation site. Experiments with Y27632 show it is a promising candidate as a therapeutic antihypertensive agent. Fasudil has been used to characterize the role of ROCK1 in vascular function in clinical studies and has been approved for use in Japan for treatment of cerebral vasospasm following subarachnoid hemorrhage.

=== Other diseases ===
The ROCK1 signaling plays an important role in many diseases including diabetes, neurodegenerative diseases such as Parkinson's disease and amyotrophic lateral sclerosis (ALS), and pulmonary hypertension.

== See also ==
- Rho kinase
