= Stress fiber =

Contractile actin bundles found in non-muscle cells

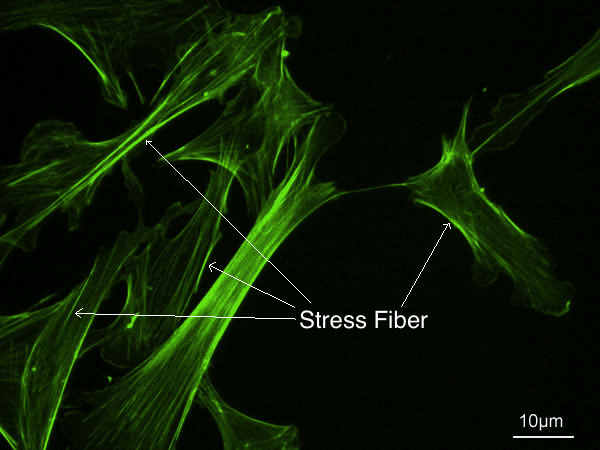
- Stress fibers – visualized via fluorescence micrograph of F-actin

Identifiers
- MeSH: D022502
- TH: H1.00.01.1.02033

Stress fibers are contractile actin bundles found in non-muscle cells. They are composed of actin (microfilaments) and non-muscle myosin II (NMMII), and also contain various crosslinking proteins, such as α-actinin, to form a highly regulated actomyosin structure within non-muscle cells. Stress fibers have been shown to play an important role in cellular contractility, providing force for a number of functions such as cell adhesion, migration and morphogenesis.

== Structure ==
Stress fibers are primarily composed of actin and myosin. Actin is a ~43kDa globular protein, and can polymerize to form long filamentous structures. These filaments are made of two strands of actin monomers (or protofilaments) wrapping around each other, to create a single actin filament. Because actin monomers are not symmetrical molecules, their filaments have polarity based upon the structure of the actin monomer, which will allow one end of the actin filament to polymerize faster than the other. The end that can polymerize faster is known as the plus-end, whereas the end that polymerizes slower is known as the minus-end. Stress fibers are usually composed of 10-30 actin filaments. Stress fibers are composed of antiparallel microfilaments: actin filaments are bundled along their length, and plus-ends and minus-ends co-mingle at each end of the bundle. The antiparallel arrangement of actin filaments within stress fibers is reinforced by α-actinin, an actin filament crosslinking protein which contains antiparallel actin-binding domains. These bundles are then cross-linked by NMMII to form stress fibers.

== Assembly and regulation ==
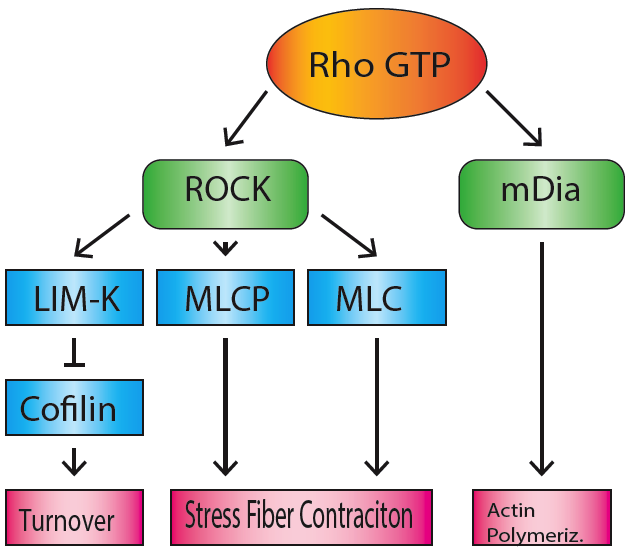
Rho Cascade - stress fiber formation

The Rho family of GTPases regulate many aspects of actin cytoskeletal dynamics, including stress fiber formation. RhoA (sometimes referred to as just 'Rho') is responsible for the formation of stress fibers, and its activity in stress fiber formation was first discovered by Ridley and Hall in 1992. When bound to GTP, Rho activates Rho-associated coiled-coil forming kinase (ROCK) and mammalian homologue of Drosophila diaphanous (mDia). mDia is a formin, which nucleates and polymerizes long actin filaments. ROCK is a kinase that acts to phosphorylate MLCP (myosin-light-chain phosphatase), as well as the NMMII light chain, which inactivates MLCP and activates myosin. This will lead to the accumulation of activated myosin motor proteins, which bind the actin filaments that were polymerized by mDia, to create stress fibers. In addition, ROCK also phosphorylates and activates LIM-kinase. LIM-kinase will in turn phosphorylate and inactivate cofilin, which will prevent the breakdown and recycling of actin filaments, maintaining the integrity of the stress fibers.

== Roles and associated proteins ==
Stress fibers play the following roles in cellular functioning:

=== Adhesion ===
Stress fibers are necessary for the formation and maintenance of cell-cell and cell-ECM adhesion, such as the formation of adherens junctions, tight junctions and focal adhesions.

==== Adherens junctions ====
Adherens junctions are a type of cell-cell adhesion structure that is present in both motile and non-motile cells, which adhere cells together via the homophilic binding of cadherins and nexins. Stress fibers play an important role in the maintenance of cadherin-dependent and nexin-dependent cell-cell contacts, and the Rho-family GTPases have been found to regulate the structure and integrity of adherens junctions. α-catenin and β-catenin are integral components of adherens junctions, which bind together to produce cadherin-α-catenin-β-catenin complexes. Early studies showed that α-catenin could interact with actin filaments, leading to the belief that α-catenin links the actin cytoskeleton to adherens junctions. However it was later found that α-catenin can only bind F-actin when it is unbound by β-catenin and cadherin.

Recently, α-catenin has been shown to associate with formins, EPLIN, and vinculin. EPLIN has been found to enhance the bundling and stabilization of actin filaments, and vinculin is involved in the linkage of adhesion molecules to the actin cytoskeleton. This may serve as a mechanism for how actin is recruited to adherens junctions.

==== Tight junctions ====
Tight junctions, or zona occludens, are the most important cellular element for the formation of semi-permeable barriers within or between tissues. Tight junctions primarily consist of claudins and occludins, which are membrane proteins that form the cell-cell contact, as well as ZO-1, ZO-2 and ZO-3, which link tight junctions to the actin cytoskeleton. However, tight junctions have not been found to be directly linked to stress fibers, like they are for focal adhesions and adherens junctions.

==== Focal adhesions ====
Focal adhesions are macromolecular assemblies that are used to connect cells to the ECM. They consist of three functional layers: an ECM-associated integrin layer, a membrane associated force transduction layer, and an actin layer, which is made up of actin stress fibers. As the naming or their layers implies, focal adhesions play a large role in mechanotransduction and cell migration. Focal adhesions are usually connected to stress fibers—in fact, stress fiber contractility is necessary for focal adhesion maintenance.

=== Migration ===
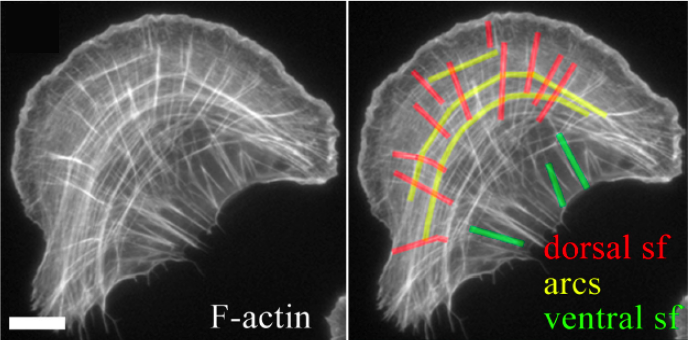
Three types of stress fibers: ventral stress fibers, transverse arcs, and dorsal stress fibers

An essential feature of many cells is their ability to migrate towards certain mechanical (Durotaxis) or chemical (Chemotaxis) stimuli. Cell migration takes place through the concerted action of three Rho family GTPases: Rho, Rac, and Cdc42. When GTP-bound, Rac will cause the formation of lamellipodia, and Cdc42 will cause the formation of filopodia, thus promoting cell migration. In the migrating cell, there are three main types of stress fibers: ventral stress fibers, transverse arcs, and dorsal stress fibers. Ventral stress fibers are associated with focal adhesions at both ends, are located on the ventral surface of the cell, and function in adhesion and contraction. Transverse arcs are not directly linked to focal adhesions, and typically flow from the leading edge of the cell, back towards the cell centre. Dorsal stress fibers are located at the leading edge of the cell. They attach to focal adhesions on the ventral surface of the leading edge, and extend dorsally, towards the cell centre to attach to transverse arcs. During cell migration, actin filaments within stress fibers will be recycled by a process of retrograde actin flow. The mechanism of dissolution of the focal adhesion itself is poorly understood.

=== Morphogenesis ===
Morphogenesis, at the cellular level, can be defined as giving shape to, or defining the architecture of a cell. The assembly of the cytoskeleton, including the actin cytoskeleton, is the determining factor in specifying cellular morphogenesis and conferring shape to cells. The contractility of stress fibers within the cell will therefore help to determine cellular morphogenesis. For example, the circumferential contractile actin belts of adherens junctions contribute to cellular morphogenesis. As well, the dorsal stress fibers, transverse arcs and ventral stress fibers aid in the determination of cell morphology during cell migration. A more detailed explanation of cellular morphogenesis can be found here.

=== Mechanotransduction ===
Both microfilaments and microtubules play major roles in mechanotransduction. In the actin cytoskeleton, mechanotransduction can occur at cell-ECM and cell-cell adhesions, through focal adhesions and adherens junctions, respectively. Transduction of forces from the outside to the inside of the cell can control the maturation or disassembly of adhesions, and initiate intracellular signalling cascades that can alter cellular behaviours, and cells are known to assemble stress fibers when they encounter mechanical stress. For example, cells that are grown on rigid substrates will show thick stress fibers, whereas the stress fibers seen in cells grown on softer substrates will be less pronounced. The mechanical force transmitted to focal adhesions by stress fibers can also alter the conformation of mechanosensitive focal adhesion proteins, such as p130Cas and talins, suggesting that stress fiber contractility may translate mechanical signals into biochemical cues. There are also a small subset of focal adhesion-associated integrins that terminate in the perinuclear actin cap (at the top of the nucleus), and are anchored there by the LINC complex. These cap-associated focal adhesions have been established as major mediators in mechanosensing, and represent a direct pathway for the transduction of mechanical cues from focal adhesions to the nucleus.

== Stress fibers in motile and non-motile cells ==
The structure of stress fibers differs between motile and non-motile cells. Stress fibers in motile and non-motile cells are similar in that they both contain actin filaments which are cross-linked by α-actinin and myosin II, however the spatial orientation of individual actin filaments within the stress fiber differ between motile and non-motile cells. Stress fibers in the ventral region of motile cells show an overall shift in individual actin filament orientation along the longitudinal axis of the stress fiber, such that the plus-ends of filaments are always predominantly pointing towards focal adhesions. Stress fibers in the ventral regions of non-motile cells show a periodic polarity that is similar to the organization of the sarcomere.

== Clinical applications ==
As discussed above, Rho is responsible for the formation of stress fibers. Misregulation of the Rho family of GTPases is implicated in many diseases. Common clinical applications that target Rho GTPases can be found here.
