= Rolf Niedergerke =

German physiologist and physician

- Born: 30 April 1921; Mülheim an der Ruhr, Germany
- Died: 27 December 2011 (aged 90); London, England
- Citizenship: German
- Education: Freiburg University; Charles University in Prague (MD)
- Known for: Muscle contraction
- Awards: Rudolf Buchheim Prize
- Scientific career
- Fields: Physiology; Biophysics
- Workplaces: Cambridge University; University College London

Rolf Nidergerke (30 April 1921 – 27 December 2011) was a German physiologist and physician, and one of the discoverers of the sliding filament theory of muscle contraction. He and Andrew Huxley, complimenting the independent works of Hugh Huxley and Jean Hanson, revealed that muscle contraction is due to shortening of the muscle fibres. He studied medicine throughout the Second World War, and obtained his MD degree as the war ended in 1945. After a brief practise in his hometown, he chose a research career. He became associated with Huxley, whom he joined at Cambridge University. Together they published a landmark paper in Nature in 1954, which became the foundation of muscle mechanics.

== Early life and education ==
Rolf Niedergerke was born and educated in Mülheim an der Ruhr. The turmoil of the Second World War almost interrupted his medical course when he was at Freiburg University. As a student of medicine he was exempted from conscription to serve in the German Army. However Germany was in no condition to maintain its education system as the Allies invaded from all corners by 1944. He could manage to continue at Charles University in Prague in Czechoslovakia (now in Czech Republic) and received his medical degree (MD) in 1945, just as the war ended. Before he returned to Germany he was arrested twice by the Russian Army, but managed to make a slip. He entered into medical service at the hospital and clinic in his hometown. He soon turned his interest to medical research. In 1947 he got an opportunity to join Prof Hermann Rein at the Physiological Institute, Göttingen, to study the electrical activity of nerve fibres. He was rather isolated in a department mainly working on the control of the circulation in mammals, so he was glad to be invited by Alexander von Muralt to work in the Theodor Kocher Institute in Bern. In Bern, Robert Stämpfli taught him to dissect single myelinated fibres. He made four important publications in German on frog nervous system (myelinated neurons) during his research training.

== Career ==
Rolf Niedergerke was encouraged to join A.F. Huxley in Cambridge University by Stämpfli, who had been a close associate of Huxley on nerve potential. Since 1951 Huxley was looking for a competent researcher for investigating the striation pattern of living skeletal muscle. Niedergerke moved to England in the autumn of 1952 as a George Henry Lewes Student with additional support from Deutsche Forschungsgemeinschaft. He was a good choice because his personal interest had been on skeletal muscle and had a good collection on the subject since his time in Göttingen. He worked using Huxley's own interference microscope. Within a year he helped to improve the technique and a research paper on the mechanism of muscle contraction was ready. At that moment almost the same observation was made by Hugh Huxley and Jean Hanson at the Massachusetts Institute of Technology. Authored in pairs their papers were simultaneously published in the 22 May 1954 issue of Nature. Their conclusion states that the observation:

"… makes very attractive the hypothesis that during contraction the actin filaments are drawn into the A-bands, between the rodlets of myosin. … If a relative force between actin and myosin is generated at each of a series of points in the region of overlap in such sarcomeres, then tension per filament should be proportional to the number in this zone of overlap".

—

This was the discovery of "Sliding Filament Theory", the first scientific evidence and the basis of modern understanding of muscle contraction. Contrary to scientific view of the time they found that the muscle as a whole do not contract of expand, but it was individual group of the muscle fibres (called I or light bands), while other fibres (A or dark bands) are never changed. The very "hypothesis" was experimentally proved in 1966.

Niedergerke moved from Cambridge to London in 1955, joining the Biophysics Department at University College London. Taking the suggestion of Bernard Katz, he continued his study on cardiac muscle (a specialised muscle of the heart), on which he discovered the role of calcium in muscle contraction (often dubbed the "calcium story") He retired from UCL in 1987.

== Death ==
Nidergerke suffered from poor health after his retirement. He gradually lost vision and hearing. His condition was exacerbated by pneumonia, and he died on 27 December 2011 at the Royal Free Hospital in London.
