= Sliding filament theory =

Explanation of muscle contraction

Sliding filament theory: A sarcomere in relaxed (above) and contracted (below) positions

The sliding filament theory explains the mechanism of muscle contraction based on muscle proteins that slide past each other to generate movement. According to the sliding filament theory, the myosin (thick filaments) of muscle fibers slide past the actin (thin filaments) during muscle contraction, while the two groups of filaments remain at relatively constant length.

The theory was independently introduced in 1954 by two research teams, one consisting of Andrew Huxley and Rolf Niedergerke from the University of Cambridge, and the other consisting of Hugh Huxley and Jean Hanson from the Massachusetts Institute of Technology. It was originally conceived by Hugh Huxley in 1953. Andrew Huxley and Niedergerke introduced it as a "very attractive" hypothesis.

Before the 1950s, there were several competing theories on muscle contraction, including electrical attraction, protein folding, and protein modification. The novel theory directly introduced a new concept called cross-bridge theory (classically swinging cross-bridge, now mostly referred to as cross-bridge cycle) which explains the molecular mechanism of sliding filament. Cross-bridge theory states that actin and myosin form a protein complex (classically called actomyosin) by attachment of myosin head on the actin filament, thereby forming a sort of cross-bridge between the two filaments. The sliding filament theory is a widely accepted explanation of the mechanism that underlies muscle contraction.

This model shows the four main and significant steps of the sliding filament theory as well as with a detailed visual.

== History ==
=== Early works ===
The first muscle protein discovered was myosin, by a German scientist Willy Kühne, who extracted and named it in 1864. In 1939, a Russian husband and wife team Vladimir Alexandrovich Engelhardt and Militsa Nikolaevna Lyubimova discovered that myosin had an enzymatic (called ATPase) property that can break down ATP to release energy. Albert Szent-Györgyi, a Hungarian physiologist, turned his focus on muscle physiology after winning the Nobel Prize in Physiology or Medicine in 1937 for his works on vitamin C and fumaric acid. He demonstrated in 1942 that ATP was the source of energy for muscle contraction. He actually observed that muscle fibres containing myosin B shortened in the presence of ATP, but not with myosin A, the experience which he later described as "perhaps the most thrilling moment of my life." With Brunó Ferenc Straub, he soon found that myosin B was associated with another protein, which they called actin, while myosin A was not. Straub purified actin in 1942, and Szent-Györgyi purified myosin A in 1943. It became apparent that myosin B was a combination of myosin A and actin, so that myosin A retained the original name, whereas they renamed myosin B as actomyosin. By the end of the 1940s Szent-Györgyi's team had postulated with evidence that contraction of actomyosin was equivalent to muscle contraction as a whole. But the notion was generally opposed, even from the likes of Nobel laureates such as Otto Fritz Meyerhof and Archibald Hill, who adhered to the prevailing dogma that myosin was a structural protein and not a functional enzyme. However, in one of his last contributions to muscle research, Szent-Györgyi demonstrated that actomyosin driven by ATP was the basic principle of muscle contraction.

=== Origin ===
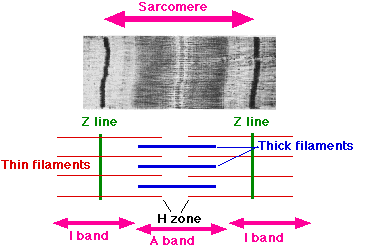
Structure of muscle fibre (sarcomere) under electron microscope with schematic explanation

By the time Hugh Huxley earned his PhD from the University of Cambridge in 1952 on his research on the structure of muscle, Szent-Györgyi had turned his career into cancer research. Huxley went to Francis O. Schmitt's laboratory at the Massachusetts Institute of Technology with a post-doctoral fellowship in September 1952, where he was joined by another English post-doctoral fellow Jean Hanson in January 1953. Hanson had a PhD in muscle structure from King's College, London in 1951. Huxley had used X-ray diffraction to speculate that muscle proteins, particularly myosin, form structured filaments giving rise to sarcomere (a segment of muscle fibre). Their main aim was to use electron microscopy to study the details of those filaments as never done before. They soon discovered and confirmed the filament nature of muscle proteins. Myosin and actin form overlapping filaments, myosin filaments mainly constituting the A band (the dark region of a sarcomere), while actin filaments traverse both the A and I (light region) bands. Huxley was the first to suggest the sliding filament theory in 1953, stating:

"… [I]f it is postulated that stretching of the muscle takes place, not by an extension of the filaments, but by a process in which the two sets of filaments slide [emphasis added] past each other; extensibility will then be inhibited if the myosin and actin are linked together."

Later, in 1996, Huxley regretted that he should have included Hanson in the formulation of his theory because it was based on their collaborative work.

Andrew Huxley (no relation), whom Alan Hodgkin described as "wizard with scientific apparatus", had just discovered the mechanism of the nerve impulse (action potential) transmission (for which he and Hodgkin later won the Nobel Prize in Physiology or Medicine in 1963) in 1949 using his own design of voltage clamp, and was looking for an associate who could properly dissect out muscle fibres. Upon recommendation of a close friend Robert Stämpfli, a German physician Rolf Niedergerke joined him at the University of Cambridge in 1952. By then he realised that the conventionally used phase-contrast microscope was not suitable for fine structures of muscle fibres, and thus developed his own interference microscope. Between March 1953 and January 1954 they executed their research. Huxley recollected that at the time the only person who ever thought of sliding filaments before 1953 was Dorothy Hodgkin (later winner of the 1964 Nobel Prize in Chemistry). He spent the summer of 1953 at Marine Biological Laboratory at Woods Hole, Massachusetts, to use electron microscope there. There he met Hugh Huxley and Hanson with whom he shared data and information on their works. They parted with an agreement that they would keep in touch, and when their aim is achieved, they would publish together, if they ever "reached similar conclusions".

== The sliding filament theory ==
Diagrammatic explanation of sliding filament hypothesis

The sliding filament theory was born from two consecutive papers published on the 22 May 1954 issue of Nature under the common theme "Structural Changes in Muscle During Contraction". Though their conclusions were fundamentally similar, their underlying experimental data and propositions were different.

=== Huxley-Niedergerke hypothesis ===
The first paper, written by Andrew Huxley and Rolf Niedergerke, is titled "Interference microscopy of living muscle fibres". It was based on their study of frog muscle using interference microscope, which Andrew Huxley developed for the purpose. According to them:

1. the I bands are composed of actin filaments, and the A bands principally of myosin filaments; and
2. during contraction, the actin filaments move into the A bands between the myosin filaments.

=== Huxley-Hanson hypothesis ===
The second paper, by Hugh Huxley and Jean Hanson, is titled "Changes in the cross-striations of muscle during contraction and stretch and their structural interpretation". It is more elaborate and was based on their study of rabbit muscle using phase contrast and electron microscopes. According to them:

1. the backbone of a muscle fibre is actin filaments which extend from the Z line up to one end of the H zone, where they are attached to an elastic component which they named "S filament";
2. myosin filaments extend from one end of the A band through the H zone up to the other end of the A band;
3. myosin filaments remain in relatively constant length during muscle stretch or contraction;
4. if myosin filaments contract beyond the length of the A band, their ends fold up to form contraction bands;
5. myosin and actin filaments lie side by side in the A band and in the absence of ATP they do not form cross-linkages;
6. during stretching, only the I bands and H zone increase in length, while A bands remain the same;
7. during contraction, actin filaments move into the A bands and the H zone is filled up reducing its stretch, the I bands shorten, the Z line comes in contact with the A bands; and
8. the possible driving force of contraction is the actin-myosin linkages which depend on ATP hydrolysis by the myosin.

== Reception and consequences ==
In spite of strong evidence, the sliding filament theory did not gain any support for several years to come. Szent-Györgyi himself refused to believe that myosin filaments were confined to the thick filament (A band). F.O. Schmitt, whose electron microscope provided the best data, also remained sceptical of the original images. There were also immediate arguments as to the organisation of the filaments, whether the two sets (myosin and actin) of filaments were merely overlapping or continuous. It was only with the new electron microscope that Hugh Huxley confirmed the overlapping nature of the filaments in 1957. It was also from this publication that the existence of actin-myosin linkage (now called cross-bridge) was clearly shown. But he took another five years to provide evidence that the cross-bridge was a dynamic interaction between actin and myosin filaments. He obtained the actual molecular arrangement of the filaments using X-ray crystallography by teaming up with Kenneth Holmes, who was trained by Rosalind Franklin, in 1965. It was only after a conference in 1972 at Cold Spring Harbor Laboratory, where the theory and its evidence were deliberated, that it became generally accepted. At the conference, as Koscak Maruyama later recalled, Hanson had to answer the criticisms by shouting, "I know I cannot explain the mechanism yet, but the sliding is a fact." The factual proofs came in the early 1980s when it could be demonstrated the actual sliding motion using novel sophisticated tools by different researchers.

=== Cross-bridge mechanism ===
With substantial evidence, Hugh Huxley formally proposed the mechanism for sliding filament which is variously called swinging cross-bridge model, cross-bridge theory or cross-bridge model. (He himself preferred the name "swinging crossbridge model", because, as he recalled, "it [the discovery] was, after all, the 1960s".) He published his theory in the 20 June 1969 issue of Science under the title "The Mechanism of Muscular Contraction". According to his theory, filament sliding occurs by cyclic attachment and detachment of myosin on actin filaments. Contraction occurs when the myosin pulls the actin filament towards the centre of the A band, detaches from actin and creates a force (stroke) to bind to the next actin molecule. This idea was subsequently proven in detail, and is more appropriately known as the cross-bridge cycle.
