= Andrew Huxley =

English physiologist and biophysicist (1917–2012)

Sir Andrew Huxley OM FRS HonFREng
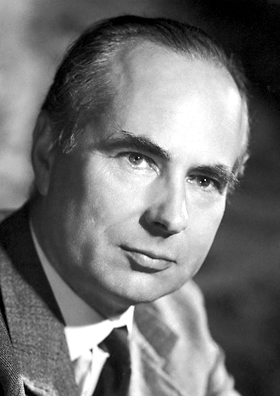
- Huxley in 1963
- Born: Andrew Fielding Huxley; 22 November 1917; Hampstead, London, England
- Died: 30 May 2012 (aged 94); Cambridge, England
- Education: University of Cambridge
- Known for: Action potentials in nerves; muscle contraction
- Spouse: J. Richenda G. Pease (m. 1947; died 2003)
- Children: 6
- Father: Leonard Huxley
- Relatives: Huxley family
- Awards: Nobel Prize in Physiology or Medicine (1963); Copley Medal (1973); Knight Bachelor (1974); Physiological Society Annual Review Prize Lecture (1973); Baly Medal (1975); Order of Merit (1983); HonFREng (1986)
- Scientific career
- Fields: Physiology; biophysics
- Workplaces: University of Cambridge; University College London

Sir Andrew Fielding Huxley (22 November 1917 – 30 May 2012) was an English physiologist and biophysicist. He was born into the prominent Huxley family. After leaving Westminster School in central London, he went to Trinity College, Cambridge, on a scholarship, after which he joined Alan Hodgkin to study nerve impulses. Their eventual discovery of the basis for propagation of nerve impulses (called an action potential) earned them the Nobel Prize in Physiology or Medicine in 1963. They made their discovery from the giant axon of the Atlantic squid. Soon after the outbreak of the Second World War, Huxley was recruited by the British Anti-Aircraft Command and later transferred to the Admiralty. After the war he resumed research at the University of Cambridge, where he developed interference microscopy that would be suitable for studying muscle fibres.

In 1952, he was joined by a German physiologist Rolf Niedergerke. Together they discovered in 1954 the mechanism of muscle contraction, popularly called the "sliding filament theory", which is the foundation of our modern understanding of muscle mechanics. In 1960 he became head of the Department of Physiology at University College London. He was elected a Fellow of the Royal Society in 1955, and President in 1980. The Royal Society awarded him the Copley Medal in 1973 for his collective contributions to the understanding of nerve impulses and muscle contraction. He was conferred a Knight Bachelor by the Queen in 1974, and was appointed to the Order of Merit in 1983. He was a fellow of Trinity College, Cambridge, until his death.

== Early life and education ==
Huxley was born at 16 Bracknell Gardens, Hampstead, London, England, on 22 November 1917. He was the youngest son of the writer and editor Leonard Huxley by Leonard Huxley's second wife Rosalind Bruce, and hence half-brother of the writer Aldous Huxley and fellow biologist Julian Huxley, and grandson of the biologist T. H. Huxley.

When he was about 12, Andrew and his brother David were given a lathe by their parents. Andrew soon became proficient at designing, making and assembling mechanical objects of all kinds, from wooden candle sticks to a working internal combustion engine. He used these practical skills throughout his career, building much of the specialized equipment he needed for his research. It was also in his early teens that he formed his lifelong interest in microscopy.

He was educated at University College School and Westminster School in Central London, where he was a King's Scholar. He graduated and won a scholarship to Trinity College, Cambridge, to read natural sciences. He had intended to become an engineer but switched to physiology after taking the subject to fulfill an elective.

== Career ==
Having entered Cambridge in 1935, Huxley graduated with a bachelor's degree in 1938. In 1939, Alan Lloyd Hodgkin returned from the US to take up a fellowship at Trinity College, and Huxley became one of his postgraduate students. Hodgkin was interested in the transmission of electrical signals along nerve fibres. Beginning in 1935 in Cambridge, he had made preliminary measurements on frog sciatic nerves suggesting that the accepted view of the nerve as a simple, elongated battery was flawed. Hodgkin invited Huxley to join him researching the problem. The work was experimentally challenging. One major problem was that the small size of most neurons made it extremely difficult to study them using the techniques of the time. They overcame this by working at the Marine Biological Association laboratory in Plymouth using the giant axon of the longfin inshore squid (Doryteuthis (formerly Loligo) pealeii), which have the largest neurons known. The experiments were still extremely challenging as the nerve impulses only last a few milliseconds, during which time they needed to measure the changing electrical potential at different points along the nerve. Using equipment largely of their own construction and design, including one of the earliest applications of a technique of electrophysiology known as the voltage clamp, they were able to record ionic currents. In 1939, they jointly published a short paper in Nature reporting on the work done in Plymouth and announcing their achievement of recording action potentials from inside a nerve fibre.

Then World War II broke out, and their research was abandoned. Huxley was recruited by the British Anti-Aircraft Command, where he worked on radar control of anti-aircraft guns. Later he was transferred to the Admiralty to do work on naval gunnery, and worked in a team led by Patrick Blackett. Hodgkin, meanwhile, was working on the development of radar at the Air Ministry. When he had a problem concerning a new type of gun sight, he contacted Huxley for advice. Huxley did a few sketches, borrowed a lathe and produced the necessary parts.

Huxley was elected to a research fellowship at Trinity College, Cambridge, in 1941. In 1946, with the war ended, he was able to take this up and to resume his collaboration with Hodgkin on understanding how nerves transmit signals. Continuing their work in Plymouth, they were, within six years, able to solve the problem using equipment they built themselves. The solution was that nerve impulses, or action potentials, do not travel down the core of the fiber, but rather along the outer membrane of the fiber as cascading waves of sodium ions diffusing inward on a rising pulse and potassium ions diffusing out on a falling edge of a pulse. In 1952, they published their theory of how action potentials are transmitted in a joint paper, in which they also describe one of the earliest computational models in biochemistry. This model forms the basis of most of the models used in neurobiology during the following four decades.

In 1952, having completed work on action potentials, Huxley was teaching physiology at Cambridge and became interested in another difficult, unsolved problem: how does muscle contract? To make progress on understanding the function of muscle, new ways of observing how the network of filaments behave during contraction were needed. Prior to the war, he had been working on a preliminary design for interference microscopy, which at the time he believed to be original, though it turned out to have been tried 50 years before and abandoned. He, however, was able to make interference microscopy work and to apply it to the problem of muscle contraction with great effect. He was able to view muscle contraction with greater precision than conventional microscopes, and to distinguish types of fiber more easily. By 1953, with the assistance of Rolf Niedergerke, he began to find the features of muscle movement. Around that time, Hugh Huxley and Jean Hanson came to a similar observation. Authored in pairs, their papers were simultaneously published in the 22 May 1954 issue of Nature. Thus the four people introduced what is called the sliding filament theory of muscle contractions. Huxley synthesized his findings, and the work of colleagues, into a detailed description of muscle structure and how muscle contraction occurs and generates force that he published in 1957. In 1966 his team provided the proof of the theory, and has remained the basis of modern understanding of muscle physiology.

In 1953, Huxley worked at Woods Hole, Massachusetts, as a Lalor Scholar. He gave the Herter Lectures at Johns Hopkins Medical School in 1959 and the Jesup Lectures at Columbia University in 1964. In 1961 he lectured on neurophysiology at Kiev University as part of an exchange scheme between British and Russian professors.

He was an editor of the Journal of Physiology from 1950 to 1957 and also of the Journal of Molecular Biology. In 1955, he was elected a Fellow of the Royal Society and served on the Council of the Royal Society from 1960 to 1962.

Huxley held college and university posts in Cambridge until 1960, when he became head of the Department of Physiology at University College London. In addition to his administrative and teaching duties, he continued to work actively on muscle contraction, and also made theoretical contributions to other work in the department, such as that on animal reflectors. In 1963, he was jointly awarded the Nobel Prize in Physiology or Medicine for his part in discoveries concerning the ionic mechanisms of the nerve cell. In 1969 he was appointed to a Royal Society Research Professorship, which he held in the Department of Physiology at University College London.

In 1980, Huxley was elected as President of the Royal Society, a post he held until 1985. In his Presidential Address in 1981, he chose to defend the Darwinian explanation of evolution, as his ancestor, T. H. Huxley had in 1860. Whereas T. H. Huxley was defying the bishops of his day, Sir Andrew was countering new theories of periods of accelerated change. In 1983, he defended the Society's decision to elect Margaret Thatcher as a fellow on the ground of her support for science even after 44 fellows had signed a letter of protest.

In 1984, he was elected Master of Trinity, succeeding his longtime collaborator, Sir Alan Hodgkin. His appointment broke the tradition that the office of Master of Trinity alternates between a scientist and an arts man. He was Master until 1990 and was fond of reminding interviewers that Trinity College had more Nobel Prize winners than did the whole of France. He maintained up to his death his position as a fellow at Trinity College, Cambridge, teaching in physiology, natural sciences and medicine. He was also a fellow of Imperial College London in 1980.

From his experimental work with Hodgkin, Huxley developed a set of differential equations that provided a mathematical explanation for nerve impulses—the "action potential". This work provided the foundation for all of the current work on voltage-sensitive membrane channels, which are responsible for the functioning of animal nervous systems. Quite separately, he developed the mathematical equations for the operation of myosin "cross-bridges" that generate the sliding forces between actin and myosin filaments, which cause the contraction of skeletal muscles. These equations presented an entirely new paradigm for understanding muscle contraction, which has been extended to provide understanding of almost all of the movements produced by cells above the level of bacteria. Together with the Swiss physiologist Robert Stämpfli, he evidenced the existence of saltatory conduction in myelinated nerve fibres.

== Awards and honours ==
Huxley, Alan Hodgkin and John Eccles jointly won the 1963 Nobel Prize in Physiology or Medicine "for their discoveries concerning the ionic mechanisms involved in excitation and inhibition in the peripheral and central portions of the nerve cell membrane". Huxley and Hodgkin won the prize for experimental and mathematical work on the process of nerve action potentials, the electrical impulses that enable the activity of an organism to be coordinated by a central nervous system. Eccles had made important discoveries on synaptic transmission.

Huxley was elected a Fellow of the Royal Society (FRS) in 1955, and was awarded its Copley Medal in 1973 "in recognition of his outstanding studies on the mechanisms of the nerve impulse and of activation of muscular contraction." Huxley was elected to the American Academy of Arts and Sciences in 1961. He was knighted by Queen Elizabeth II on 12 November 1974. He was elected to the American Philosophical Society in 1975 and the United States National Academy of Sciences in 1979. He was appointed to the Order of Merit on 11 November 1983. In 1976–77, he was President of the British Science Association and from 1980 to 1985 he served as President of the Royal Society. In 1986 he was elected an Honorary Fellow of the Royal Academy of Engineering then known as the Fellowship of Engineering.

Huxley's portrait by David Poole hangs in Trinity College's collection.

== Personal life ==
In 1947, Huxley married Jocelyn "Richenda" Gammell (née Pease), the daughter of the geneticist Michael Pease (a son of Edward R. Pease) and his wife Helen Bowen Wedgwood, eldest daughter of the first Lord Wedgwood (see also Darwin–Wedgwood family). They had one son and five daughters – Janet Rachel Huxley (born 20 April 1948), Stewart Leonard Huxley (born 19 December 1949), Camilla Rosalind Huxley (born 12 March 1952), Eleanor Bruce Huxley (born 21 February 1959), Henrietta Catherine Huxley (born 25 December 1960), and Clare Marjory Pease Huxley (born 4 November 1962).

=== Death ===
Huxley died at Addenbrooke's Hospital in Cambridge on 30 May 2012. He was survived by his six children, grandchildren, and great-grandchildren. His wife Richenda, Lady Huxley died in 2003, aged 78. A funeral service was held in Trinity College Chapel on 13 June 2012, followed by a private cremation.

== Publications ==
- Huxley, A. F., 1980. Reflections on muscle. The Sherrington Lectures XIV. Liverpool.

== Popular culture ==
Huxley was mentioned in S11 E6 of Archer: "The Double Date".

== See also ==
- Hodgkin–Huxley model
- Huxley family
- List of presidents of the Royal Society

Academic offices
Preceded by Richard John Harrison	Fullerian Professor of Physiology; 1967–1973	Succeeded by Max Ferdinand Perutz
Preceded by Sir Alan Hodgkin	34th Master of Trinity College, Cambridge; 1984–1990	Succeeded by Sir Michael Atiyah
Professional and academic associations
Preceded by Alexander Robertus Todd	55th President of the Royal Society; 1980–1985	Succeeded by George Porter
