= Muscle contraction =

Activation of tension-generating sites in muscle

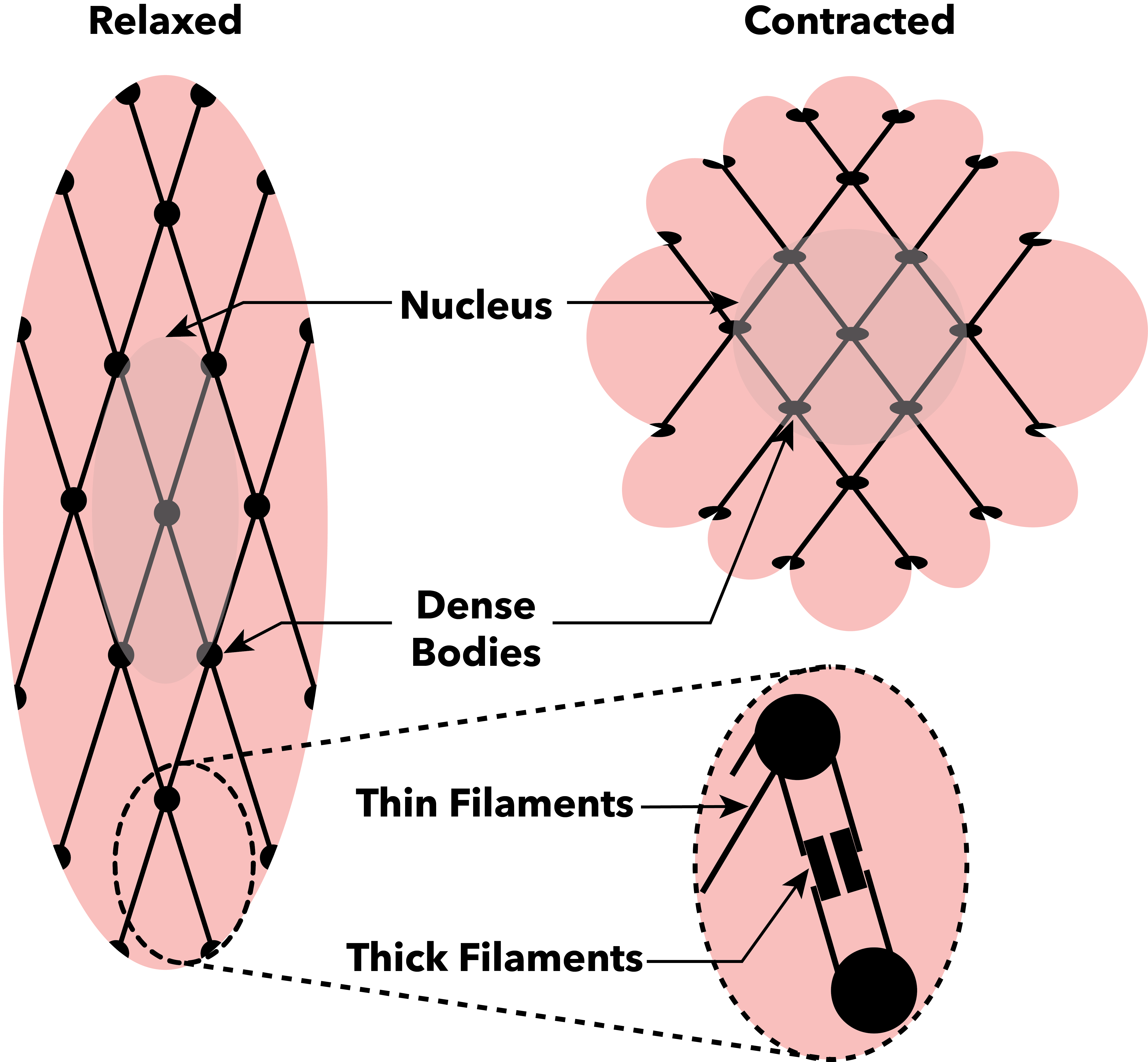
Depiction of smooth muscle contraction

Muscle contraction is the activation of tension-generating sites within muscle cells. In physiology, muscle contraction does not necessarily mean muscle shortening because muscle tension can be produced without changes in muscle length (isometric contraction), such as when holding something heavy in the same position. The termination of muscle contraction is followed by muscle relaxation, which is a return of the muscle fibers to their low tension-generating state.

For the contractions to happen, the muscle cells must rely on the interaction of two types of filament: thin and thick filaments.

The major constituent of thin filaments is a chain formed by helical coiling of two strands of actin, and thick filaments predominantly consist of chains of the motor-protein myosin. Together, these two filaments form myofibrils - the basic functional organelles in the skeletal muscle system.

In vertebrates, skeletal muscle contractions are neurogenic as they require synaptic input from motor neurons. A single motor neuron is able to innervate multiple muscle fibers, thereby causing the fibers to contract at the same time. Once innervated, the protein filaments within each skeletal muscle fiber slide past each other to produce a contraction, which is explained by the sliding filament theory. The contraction produced can be described as a twitch, summation, or tetanus, depending on the frequency of action potentials. In skeletal muscles, muscle tension is at its greatest when the muscle is stretched to an intermediate length as described by the length-tension relationship.

Unlike skeletal muscle, the contractions of smooth and cardiac muscles are myogenic (meaning that they are initiated by the smooth or heart muscle cells themselves instead of being stimulated by an outside event such as nerve stimulation), although they can be modulated by stimuli from the autonomic nervous system. The mechanisms of contraction in these muscle tissues are similar to those in skeletal muscle tissues.

Muscle contraction can also be described in terms of two variables: length and tension. In natural movements that underlie locomotor activity, muscle contractions are multifaceted as they are able to produce changes in length and tension in a time-varying manner. Therefore, neither length nor tension is likely to remain the same in skeletal muscles that contract during locomotion. Contractions can be described as isometric if the muscle tension changes but the muscle length remains the same. In contrast, a muscle contraction is described as isotonic if muscle tension remains the same throughout the contraction. If the muscle length shortens, the contraction is concentric; if the muscle length lengthens, the contraction is eccentric.

== Types ==
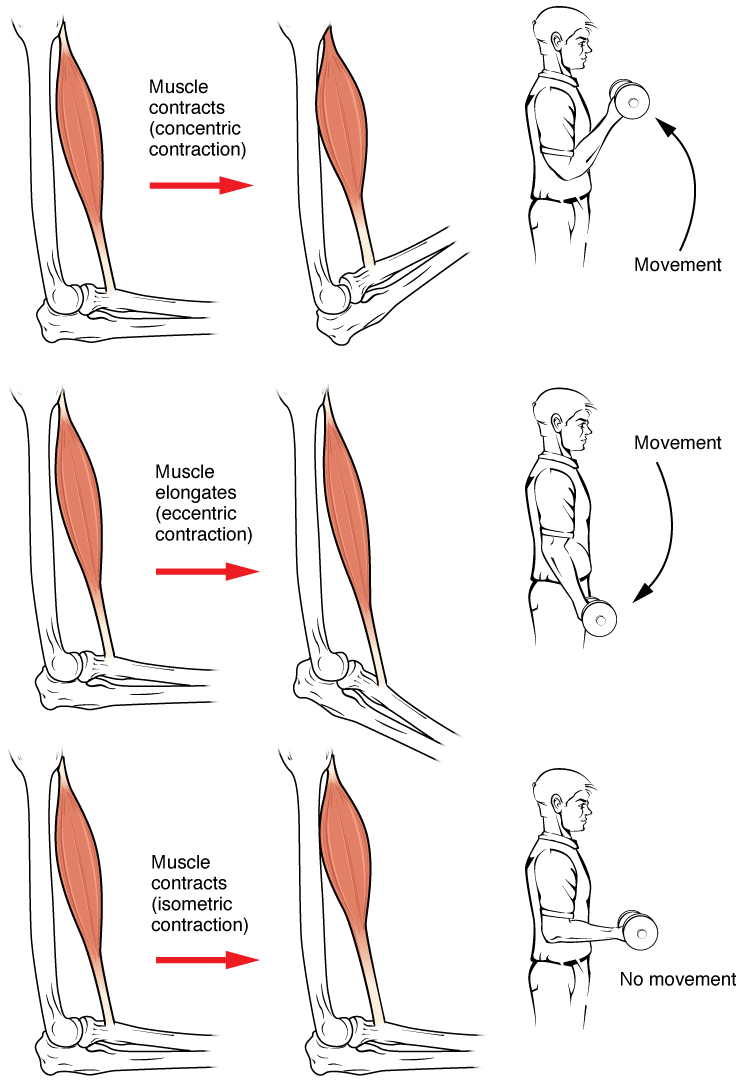
Types of muscle contractions

Muscle contractions can be described based on two variables: force and length. Force itself can be differentiated as either tension or load. Muscle tension is the force exerted by the muscle on an object whereas a load is the force exerted by an object on the muscle. When muscle tension changes without any corresponding changes in muscle length, the muscle contraction is described as isometric. If the muscle length changes while muscle tension remains the same, then the muscle contraction is isotonic. In an isotonic contraction, the muscle length can either shorten to produce a concentric contraction or lengthen to produce an eccentric contraction. In natural movements that underlie locomotor activity, muscle contractions are multifaceted as they are able to produce changes in length and tension in a time-varying manner. Therefore, neither length nor tension is likely to remain constant when the muscle is active during locomotor activity.

=== Isometric contraction ===
An isometric contraction of a muscle generates tension without changing length. An example can be found when the muscles of the hand and forearm grip an object; the joints of the hand do not move, but muscles generate sufficient force to prevent the object from being dropped.

=== Isotonic contraction ===
In isotonic contraction, the tension in the muscle remains constant despite a change in muscle length. This occurs when a muscle's force of contraction matches the total load on the muscle.

==== Concentric contraction ====
In concentric contraction, muscle tension is sufficient to overcome the load, and the muscle shortens as it contracts. This occurs when the force generated by the muscle exceeds the load opposing its contraction.

During a concentric contraction, a muscle is stimulated to contract according to the sliding filament theory. This occurs throughout the length of the muscle, generating a force at the origin and insertion, causing the muscle to shorten and changing the angle of the joint. In relation to the elbow, a concentric contraction of the biceps would cause the arm to bend at the elbow as the hand moved from the leg to the shoulder (a biceps curl). A concentric contraction of the triceps would change the angle of the joint in the opposite direction, straightening the arm and moving the hand towards the leg.

==== Eccentric contraction ====
In eccentric contraction, the tension generated while isometric is insufficient to overcome the external load on the muscle and the muscle fibers lengthen as they contract. Rather than working to pull a joint in the direction of the muscle contraction, the muscle acts to decelerate the joint at the end of a movement or otherwise control the repositioning of a load. This can occur involuntarily (e.g., when attempting to move a weight too heavy for the muscle to lift) or voluntarily (e.g., when the muscle is 'smoothing out' a movement or resisting gravity such as during downhill walking). Over the short-term, strength training involving both eccentric and concentric contractions appear to increase muscular strength more than training with concentric contractions alone. However, exercise-induced muscle damage is also greater during lengthening contractions.

During an eccentric contraction of the biceps muscle, the elbow starts the movement while bent and then straightens as the hand moves away from the shoulder. During an eccentric contraction of the triceps muscle, the elbow starts the movement straight and then bends as the hand moves towards the shoulder. Desmin, titin, and other z-line proteins are involved in eccentric contractions, but their mechanism is poorly understood in comparison to cross-bridge cycling in concentric contractions.

Though the muscle is doing a negative amount of mechanical work, (work is being done on the muscle), chemical energy (of fat or glucose, or temporarily stored in ATP) is nevertheless consumed, although less than would be consumed during a concentric contraction of the same force. For example, one expends more energy going up a flight of stairs than going down the same flight.

Muscles undergoing heavy eccentric loading suffer greater damage when overloaded (such as during muscle building or strength training exercise) as compared to concentric loading. When eccentric contractions are used in weight training, they are normally called negatives. During a concentric contraction, contractile muscle myofilaments of myosin and actin slide past each other, pulling the Z-lines together. During an eccentric contraction, the myofilaments slide past each other the opposite way, though the actual movement of the myosin heads during an eccentric contraction is not known. Exercise featuring a heavy eccentric load can actually support a greater weight (muscles are approximately 40% stronger during eccentric contractions than during concentric contractions) and also results in greater muscular damage and delayed onset muscle soreness one to two days after training. Exercise that incorporates both eccentric and concentric muscular contractions (i.e., involving a strong contraction and a controlled lowering of the weight) can produce greater gains in strength than concentric contractions alone. While unaccustomed heavy eccentric contractions can easily lead to overtraining, moderate training may confer protection against injury.

===== Eccentric contractions in movement =====
Eccentric contractions normally occur as a braking force in opposition to a concentric contraction to protect joints from damage. During virtually any routine movement, eccentric contractions assist in keeping motions smooth, but can also slow rapid movements such as a punch or throw. Part of training for rapid movements such as pitching during baseball involves reducing eccentric braking allowing a greater power to be developed throughout the movement.

Eccentric contractions are being researched for their ability to speed rehabilitation of weak or injured tendons. Achilles tendinitis and patellar tendonitis (also known as jumper's knee or patellar tendonosis) have been shown to benefit from high-load eccentric contractions.

== Vertebrate ==
In vertebrate animals, there are three types of muscle tissues: 1) skeletal, 2) smooth, and 3) cardiac

In vertebrate animals, there are three types of muscle tissues: skeletal, smooth, and cardiac. Skeletal muscle constitutes the majority of muscle mass in the body and is responsible for locomotor activity. Smooth muscle forms blood vessels, the gastrointestinal tract, and other areas in the body that produce sustained contractions. Cardiac muscle makes up the heart, which pumps blood. Skeletal and cardiac muscles are called striated muscle because of their striped appearance under a microscope, which is due to the highly organized alternating pattern of A bands and I bands.

=== Skeletal muscle ===
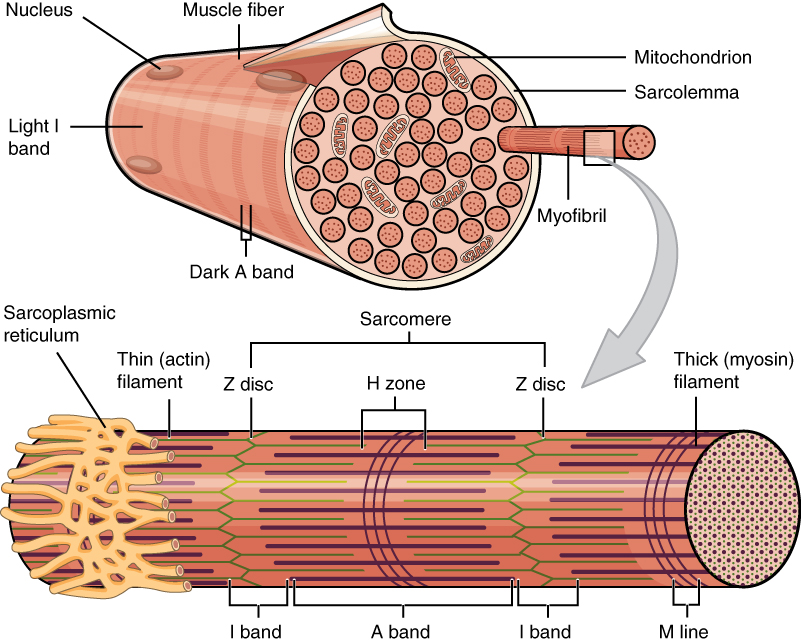
Organization of skeletal muscle

Excluding reflexes, all skeletal muscle contractions occur as a result of signals originating in the brain. The brain sends electrochemical signals through the nervous system to the motor neuron that innervates several muscle fibers. In the case of some reflexes, the signal to contract can originate in the spinal cord through a feedback loop with the grey matter. Other actions such as locomotion, breathing, and chewing have a reflex aspect to them: the contractions can be initiated either consciously or unconsciously.

==== Neuromuscular junction ====
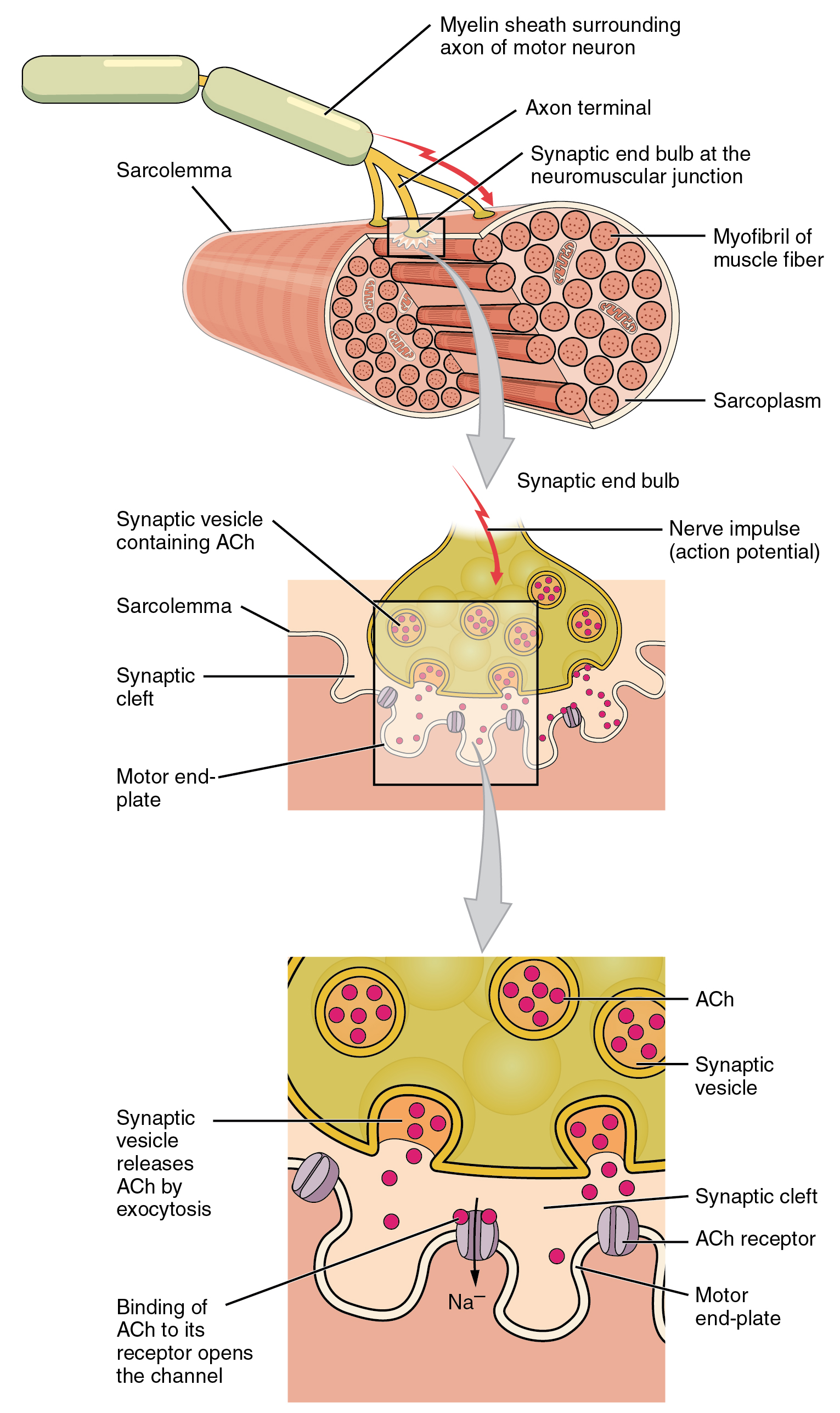
Structure of neuromuscular junction.

A neuromuscular junction is a chemical synapse formed by the contact between a motor neuron and a muscle fiber. It is the site in which a motor neuron transmits a signal to a muscle fiber to initiate muscle contraction. The sequence of events that results in the depolarization of the muscle fiber at the neuromuscular junction begins when an action potential is initiated in the cell body of a motor neuron, which is then propagated by saltatory conduction along its axon toward the neuromuscular junction. Once it reaches the terminal bouton, the action potential causes a Ca^{2+} ion influx into the terminal by way of the voltage-gated calcium channels. The Ca^{2+} influx causes synaptic vesicles containing the neurotransmitter acetylcholine to fuse with the plasma membrane, releasing acetylcholine into the synaptic cleft between the motor neuron terminal and the neuromuscular junction of the skeletal muscle fiber. Acetylcholine diffuses across the synapse and binds to and activates nicotinic acetylcholine receptors on the neuromuscular junction.

Activation of the nicotinic receptor opens its intrinsic sodium/potassium channel, causing sodium to rush in and potassium to trickle out. As a result, the sarcolemma reverses polarity and its voltage quickly jumps from the resting membrane potential of −90mV to as high as +75mV as sodium enters. The membrane potential then becomes hyperpolarized when potassium exits and is then adjusted back to the resting membrane potential. This rapid fluctuation is called the end-plate potential. The voltage-gated ion channels of the sarcolemma next to the end plate open in response to the end plate potential. They are sodium and potassium specific and only allow one through. This wave of ion movements creates the action potential that spreads from the motor end plate in all directions. If action potentials stop arriving, then acetylcholine ceases to be released from the terminal bouton. The remaining acetylcholine in the synaptic cleft is either degraded by active acetylcholine esterase or reabsorbed by the synaptic knob and none is left to replace the degraded acetylcholine.

==== Excitation–contraction coupling ====
Excitation–contraction coupling (ECC) is the process by which a muscular action potential in the muscle fiber causes myofibrils to contract. In skeletal muscles, excitation–contraction coupling relies on a direct coupling between two key proteins, the sarcoplasmic reticulum (SR) calcium release channel identified as the ryanodine receptor 1 (RYR1) and the voltage-gated L-type calcium channel identified as dihydropyridine receptors, (DHPRs). DHPRs are located on the sarcolemma (which includes the surface sarcolemma and the transverse tubules), while the RyRs reside across the SR membrane. The close apposition of a transverse tubule and two SR regions containing RyRs is described as a triad and is predominantly where excitation–contraction coupling takes place.

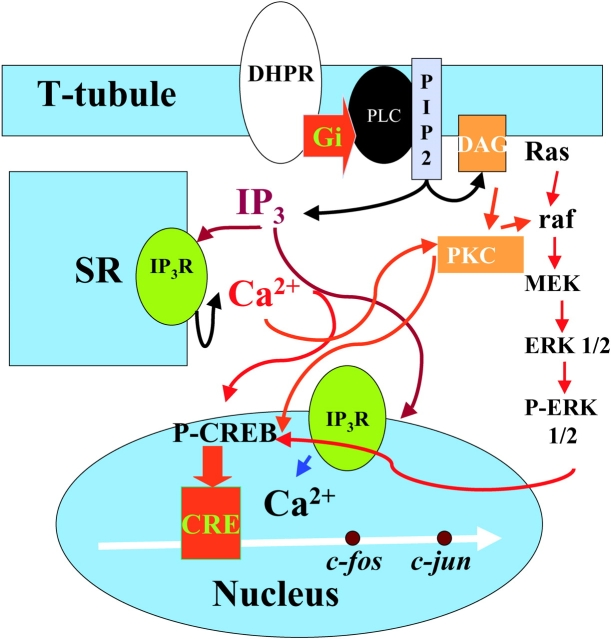
Picture showing the different interactions within the ECC pathway

Excitation–contraction coupling (ECC) occurs when depolarization of skeletal muscles (usually through neural innervation) results in a muscle action potential. This action potential spreads across the muscle's surface and into the muscle fiber's network of T-tubules, depolarizing the inner portion of the muscle fiber. This activates dihydropyridine receptors in the transverse tubules, which are in close proximity to ryanodine receptors in the adjacent terminal cisternae of the sarcoplasmic reticulum. The activated dihydropyridine receptors physically interact with ryanodine receptors to activate them via foot processes (involving conformational changes that allosterically activates the ryanodine receptors). As ryanodine receptors open, Ca^{2+} is released from the sarcoplasmic reticulum into the local junctional space and diffuses into the bulk cytoplasm to cause a calcium spark. The action potential creates a near synchronous activation of thousands of calcium sparks and causes a cell-wide increase in calcium giving rise to the upstroke of the calcium transient. The Ca^{2+} released into the cytosol binds to Troponin C by the actin filaments. This bond allows the actin filaments to perform cross-bridge cycling, producing force and, in some situations, motion.

When the desired motion is accomplished, relaxation can be achieved quickly through numerous pathways. Relaxation is quickly achieved through a Ca^{2+} buffer with various cytoplasmic proteins binding to Ca^{2+} with very high affinity. These cytoplasmic proteins allow for quick relaxation in fast twitch muscles. Although slower, the sarco/endoplasmic reticulum calcium-ATPase (SERCA) actively pumps Ca^{2+} back into the sarcoplasmic reticulum, resulting in a permanent relaxation until the next action potential arrives.

Mitochondria also participate in Ca^{2+} reuptake, ultimately delivering their gathered Ca^{2+} to SERCA for storage in the sarcoplasmic reticulum. A few of the relaxation mechanisms (NCX, Ca^{2+} pumps and Ca^{2+} leak channels) move Ca^{2+} completely out of the cells as well. As Ca^{2+} concentration declines to resting levels, Ca^{2+} releases from Troponin C, disallowing cross bridge-cycling, causing the force to decline and relaxation to occur. Once relaxation has fully occurred, the muscle is able to contract again, thus fully resetting the cycle.

==== Sliding filament theory ====
Sliding filament theory: A sarcomere in relaxed (above) and contracted (below) positions

The sliding filament theory describes a process used by muscles to contract. It is a cycle of repetitive events that cause a thin filament to slide over a thick filament and generate tension in the muscle. It was independently developed by Andrew Huxley and Rolf Niedergerke and by Hugh Huxley and Jean Hanson in 1954. Physiologically, this contraction is not uniform across the sarcomere; the central position of the thick filaments becomes unstable and can shift during contraction but this is countered by the actions of the elastic myofilament of titin. This fine myofilament maintains uniform tension across the sarcomere by pulling the thick filament into a central position.

==== Cross-bridge cycle ====
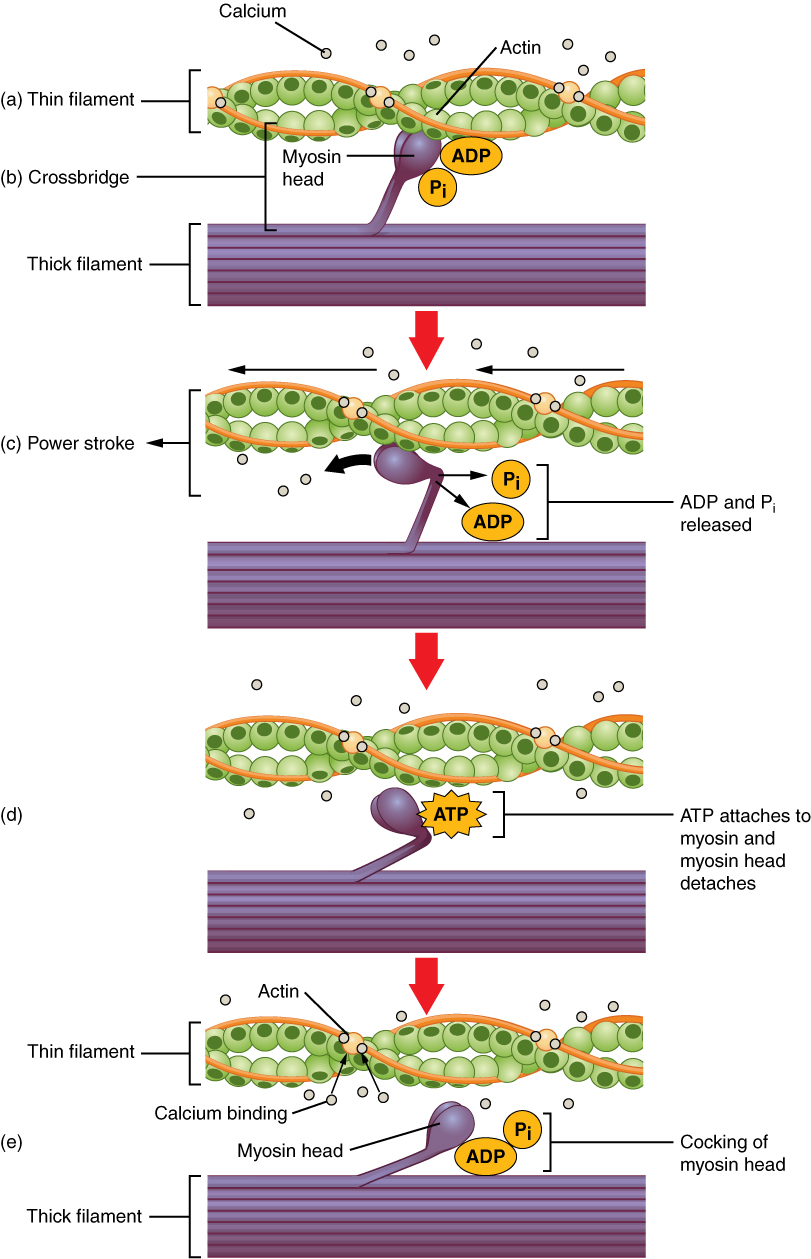
Cross-bridge cycle

Cross-bridge cycling is a sequence of molecular events that underlies the sliding filament theory. A cross-bridge is a myosin projection, consisting of two myosin heads, that extends from the thick filaments. Each myosin head has two binding sites: one for adenosine triphosphate (ATP) and another for actin. The binding of ATP to a myosin head detaches myosin from actin, thereby allowing myosin to bind to another actin molecule. Once attached, the ATP is hydrolysed by myosin, which uses the released energy to move into the "cocked position" whereby it binds weakly to a part of the actin binding site. The remainder of the actin binding site is blocked by tropomyosin. With the ATP hydrolysed, the cocked myosin head now contains adenosine diphosphate (ADP) + P_{i}. Two Ca^{2+} ions bind to troponin C on the actin filaments. The troponin-Ca^{2+} complex causes tropomyosin to slide over and unblock the remainder of the actin binding site. Unblocking the rest of the actin binding sites allows the two myosin heads to close and myosin to bind strongly to actin. The myosin head then releases the inorganic phosphate and initiates a power stroke, which generates a force of 2 pN. The power stroke moves the actin filament inwards, thereby shortening the sarcomere. Myosin then releases ADP but still remains tightly bound to actin. At the end of the power stroke, ADP is released from the myosin head, leaving myosin attached to actin in a rigor state until another ATP binds to myosin. A lack of ATP would result in the rigor state characteristic of rigor mortis. Once another ATP binds to myosin, the myosin head will again detach from actin and another cross-bridge cycle occurs.

Cross-bridge cycling is able to continue as long as there are sufficient amounts of ATP and Ca^{2+} in the cytoplasm. Termination of cross-bridge cycling can occur when Ca^{2+} is actively pumped back into the sarcoplasmic reticulum. When Ca^{2+} is no longer present on the thin filament, the tropomyosin changes conformation back to its previous state so as to block the binding sites again. The myosin ceases binding to the thin filament, and the muscle relaxes. The Ca^{2+} ions leave the troponin molecule to maintain the Ca^{2+} ion concentration in the sarcoplasm. The active pumping of Ca^{2+} ions into the sarcoplasmic reticulum creates a deficiency in the fluid around the myofibrils. This causes the removal of Ca^{2+} ions from the troponin. Thus, the tropomyosin-troponin complex again covers the binding sites on the actin filaments and contraction ceases.

==== Gradation of skeletal muscle contractions ====
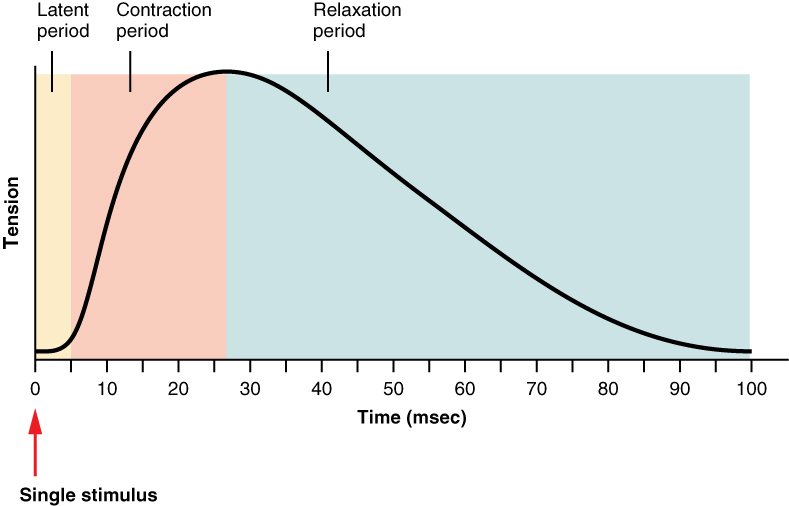
Twitch

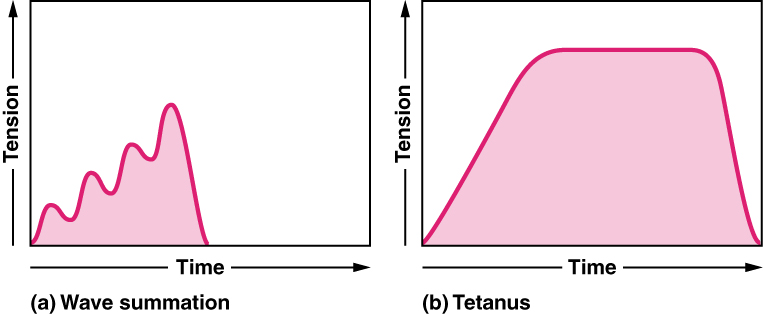
Summation and tetanus

Three types of skeletal muscle contractions

The strength of skeletal muscle contractions can be broadly separated into twitch, summation, and tetanus. A twitch is a single contraction and relaxation cycle produced by an action potential within the muscle fiber itself. The time between a stimulus to the motor nerve and the subsequent contraction of the innervated muscle is called the latent period, which usually takes about 10 ms and is caused by the time taken for nerve action potential to propagate, the time for chemical transmission at the neuromuscular junction, then the subsequent steps in excitation-contraction coupling.

If another muscle action potential were to be produced before the complete relaxation of a muscle twitch, then the next twitch will simply sum onto the previous twitch, thereby producing a summation. Summation can be achieved in two ways: frequency summation and multiple fiber summation. In frequency summation, the force exerted by the skeletal muscle is controlled by varying the frequency at which action potentials are sent to muscle fibers. Action potentials do not arrive at muscles synchronously, and, during a contraction, some fraction of the fibers in the muscle will be firing at any given time. In a typical circumstance, when humans are exerting their muscles as hard as they are consciously able, roughly one-third of the fibers in each of those muscles will fire at once, though this ratio can be affected by various physiological and psychological factors (including Golgi tendon organs and Renshaw cells). This 'low' level of contraction is a protective mechanism to prevent avulsion of the tendon—the force generated by a 95% contraction of all fibers is sufficient to damage the body. In multiple fiber summation, if the central nervous system sends a weak signal to contract a muscle, the smaller motor units, being more excitable than the larger ones, are stimulated first. As the strength of the signal increases, more motor units are excited in addition to larger ones, with the largest motor units having as much as 50 times the contractile strength as the smaller ones. As more and larger motor units are activated, the force of muscle contraction becomes progressively stronger. A concept known as the size principle, allows for a gradation of muscle force during weak contraction to occur in small steps, which then become progressively larger when greater amounts of force are required.

Finally, if the frequency of muscle action potentials increases such that the muscle contraction reaches its peak force and plateaus at this level, then the contraction is a tetanus.

==== Length-tension relationship ====
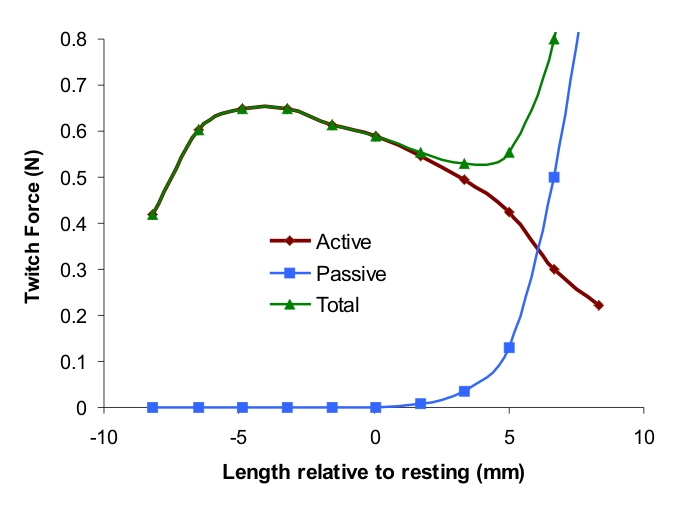
Muscle length versus isometric force

Length-tension relationship relates the strength of an isometric contraction to the length of the muscle at which the contraction occurs. Muscles operate with greatest active tension when close to an ideal length (often their resting length). When stretched or shortened beyond this (whether due to the action of the muscle itself or by an outside force), the maximum active tension generated decreases. This decrease is minimal for small deviations, but the tension drops off rapidly as the length deviates further from the ideal. Due to the presence of elastic proteins within a muscle cell (such as titin) and extracellular matrix, as the muscle is stretched beyond a given length, there is an entirely passive tension, which opposes lengthening. Combined, there is a strong resistance to lengthening an active muscle far beyond the peak of active tension.

==== Force-velocity relationships ====
Force–velocity relationship: right of the vertical axis concentric contractions (the muscle is shortening), left of the axis eccentric contractions (the muscle is lengthened under load); power developed by the muscle in red. Since power is equal to force times velocity, the muscle generates no power at either isometric force (due to zero velocity) or maximal velocity (due to zero force). The optimal shortening velocity for power generation is approximately one-third of maximum shortening velocity.

Force–velocity relationship relates the speed at which a muscle changes its length (usually regulated by external forces, such as load or other muscles) to the amount of force that it generates. Force declines in a hyperbolic fashion relative to the isometric force as the shortening velocity increases, eventually reaching zero at some maximum velocity. The reverse holds true for when the muscle is stretched – force increases above isometric maximum, until finally reaching an absolute maximum. This intrinsic property of active muscle tissue plays a role in the active damping of joints that are actuated by simultaneously active opposing muscles. In such cases, the force-velocity profile enhances the force produced by the lengthening muscle at the expense of the shortening muscle. This favoring of whichever muscle returns the joint to equilibrium effectively increases the damping of the joint. Moreover, the strength of the damping increases with muscle force. The motor system can thus actively control joint damping via the simultaneous contraction (co-contraction) of opposing muscle groups.

=== Smooth muscle ===
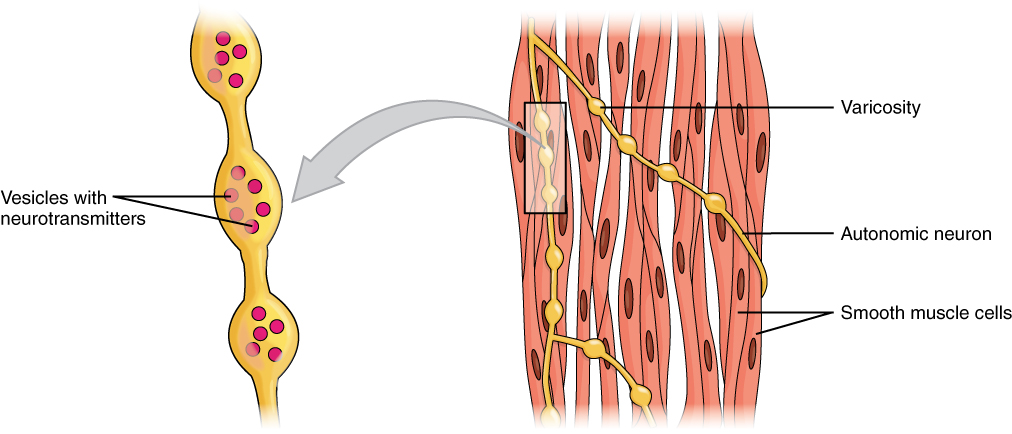
Swellings called varicosities belonging to an autonomic neuron innervate the smooth muscle cells.

Smooth muscles can be divided into two subgroups: single-unit and multiunit. Single-unit smooth muscle cells can be found in the gut and blood vessels. Because these cells are linked together by gap junctions, they are able to contract as a functional syncytium. Single-unit smooth muscle cells contract myogenically, which can be modulated by the autonomic nervous system.

Unlike single-unit smooth muscle cells, multiunit smooth muscle cells are found in the muscle of the eye and in the base of hair follicles. Multiunit smooth muscle cells contract by being separately stimulated by nerves of the autonomic nervous system. As such, they allow for fine control and gradual responses, much like motor unit recruitment in skeletal muscle.

==== Mechanisms of smooth muscle contraction ====
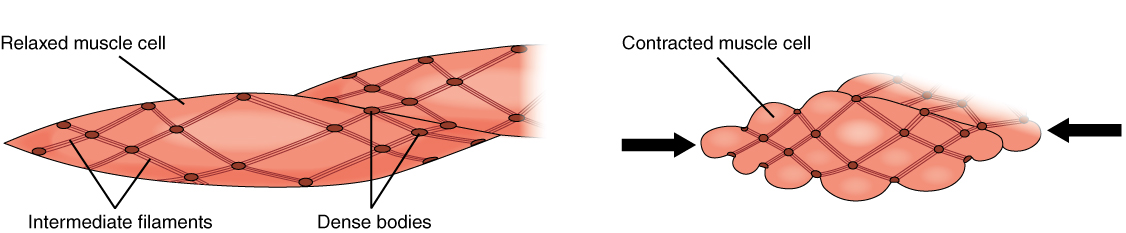
Smooth muscle contractions

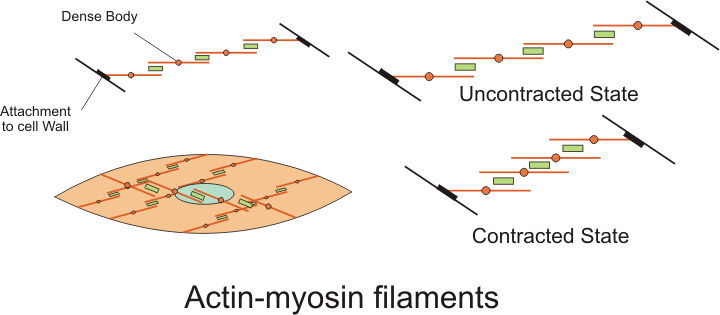
Sliding filaments in contracted and uncontracted states

The contractile activity of smooth muscle cells can be tonic (sustained) or phasic (transient) and is influenced by multiple inputs such as spontaneous electrical activity, neural and hormonal inputs, local changes in chemical composition, and stretch. This is in contrast to the contractile activity of skeletal muscle cells, which relies on a single neural input. Some types of smooth muscle cells are able to generate their own action potentials spontaneously, which usually occur following a pacemaker potential or a slow wave potential. These action potentials are generated by the influx of extracellular Ca^{2+}, and not Na^{+}. Like skeletal muscles, cytosolic Ca^{2+} ions are also required for crossbridge cycling in smooth muscle cells.

The two sources for cytosolic Ca^{2+} in smooth muscle cells are the extracellular Ca^{2+} entering through calcium channels and the Ca^{2+} ions that are released from the sarcoplasmic reticulum. The elevation of cytosolic Ca^{2+} results in more Ca^{2+} binding to calmodulin, which then binds and activates myosin light-chain kinase. The calcium-calmodulin-myosin light-chain kinase complex phosphorylates myosin on the 20 kilodalton (kDa) myosin light chains on amino acid residue-serine 19, enabling the molecular interaction of myosin and actin, and initiating contraction and activating the myosin ATPase. Unlike skeletal muscle cells, smooth muscle cells lack troponin, even though they contain the thin filament protein tropomyosin and other notable proteins – caldesmon and calponin. Thus, smooth muscle contractions are initiated by the Ca^{2+}-activated phosphorylation of myosin rather than Ca^{2+} binding to the troponin complex that regulates myosin binding sites on actin like in skeletal and cardiac muscles.

Termination of crossbridge cycling (and leaving the muscle in latch-state) occurs when myosin light chain phosphatase removes the phosphate groups from the myosin heads. Phosphorylation of the 20 kDa myosin light chains correlates well with the shortening velocity of smooth muscle. During this period, there is a rapid burst of energy use as measured by oxygen consumption. Within a few minutes of initiation, the calcium level markedly decreases, the 20 kDa myosin light chains' phosphorylation decreases, and energy use decreases; however, force in tonic smooth muscle is maintained. During contraction of muscle, rapidly cycling crossbridges form between activated actin and phosphorylated myosin, generating force. It is hypothesized that the maintenance of force results from dephosphorylated "latch-bridges" that slowly cycle and maintain force. A number of kinases such as rho kinase, DAPK3, and protein kinase C are believed to participate in the sustained phase of contraction, and Ca^{2+} flux may be significant.

==== Neuromodulation ====
Although smooth muscle contractions are myogenic, the rate and strength of their contractions can be modulated by the autonomic nervous system. Postganglionic nerve fibers of parasympathetic nervous system release the neurotransmitter acetylcholine, which binds to muscarinic acetylcholine receptors (mAChRs) on smooth muscle cells. These receptors are metabotropic, or G-protein coupled receptors that initiate a second messenger cascade. Conversely, postganglionic nerve fibers of the sympathetic nervous system release the neurotransmitters epinephrine and norepinephrine, which bind to adrenergic receptors that are also metabotropic. The exact effects on the smooth muscle depend on the specific characteristics of the receptor activated—both parasympathetic input and sympathetic input can be either excitatory (contractile) or inhibitory (relaxing).

=== Cardiac muscle ===
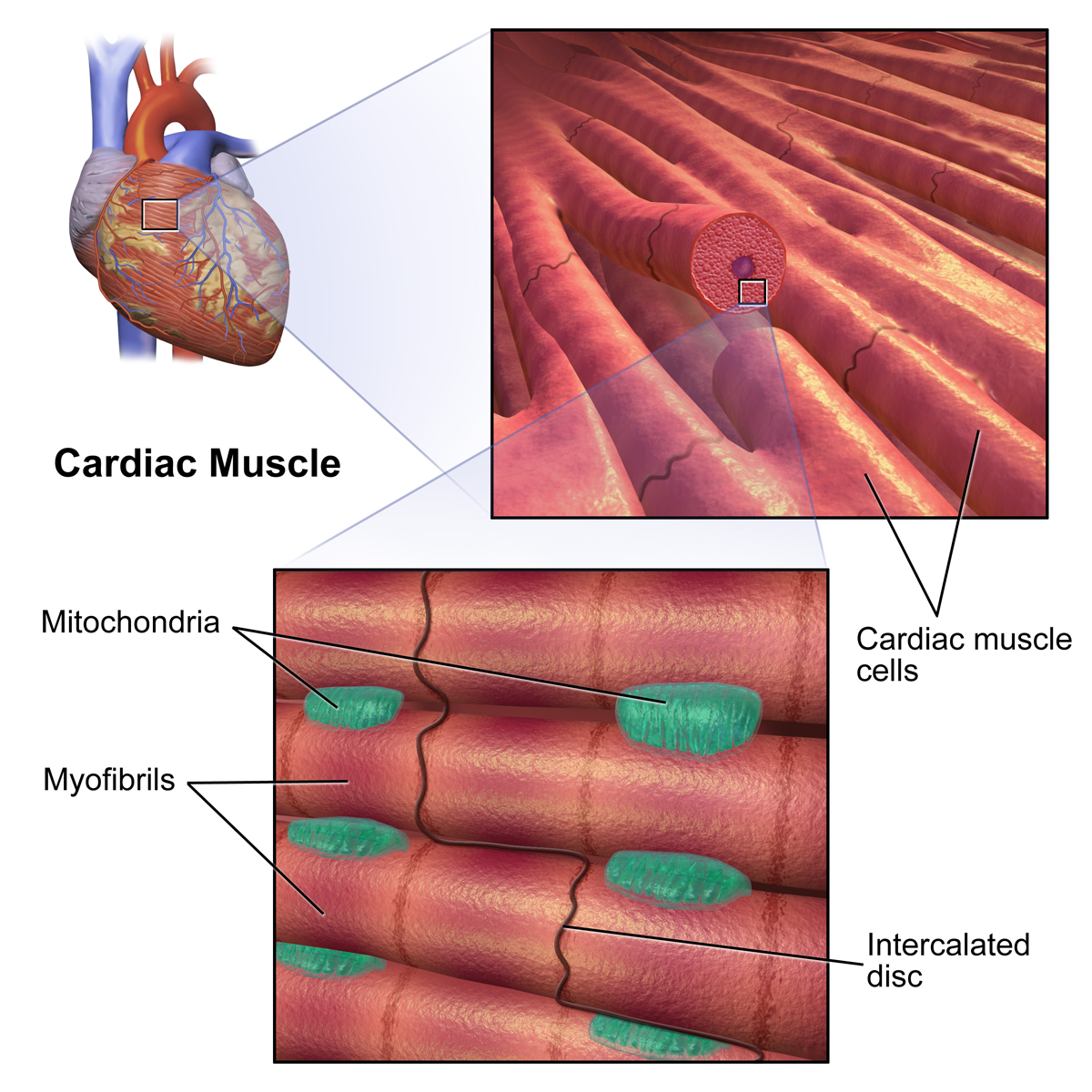
Cardiac muscle

There are two types of cardiac muscle cells: autorhythmic and contractile. Autorhythmic cells do not contract, but instead set the pace of contraction for other cardiac muscle cells, which can be modulated by the autonomic nervous system. In contrast, contractile muscle cells (cardiomyocytes) constitute the majority of the heart muscle and are able to contract.

==== Excitation-contraction coupling ====
In both skeletal and cardiac muscle excitation-contraction (E-C) coupling, depolarization conduction and Ca^{2+} release processes occur. However, though the proteins involved are similar, they are distinct in structure and regulation. The dihydropyridine receptors (DHPRs) are encoded by different genes, and the ryanodine receptors (RyRs) are distinct isoforms. Besides, DHPR contacts with RyR1 (main RyR isoform in skeletal muscle) to regulate Ca^{2+} release in skeletal muscle, while the L-type calcium channel (DHPR on cardiac myocytes) and RyR2 (main RyR isoform in cardiac muscle) are not physically coupled in cardiac muscle, but face with each other by a junctional coupling.

Unlike skeletal muscle, E-C coupling in cardiac muscle is thought to depend primarily on a mechanism called calcium-induced calcium release, which is based on the junctional structure between T-tubule and sarcoplasmic reticulum. Junctophilin-2 (JPH2) is essential to maintain this structure, as well as the integrity of T-tubule. Another protein, receptor accessory protein 5 (REEP5), functions to keep the normal morphology of junctional SR. Defects of junctional coupling can result from deficiencies of either of the two proteins. During the process of calcium-induced calcium release, RyR2s are activated by a calcium trigger, which is brought about by the flow of Ca^{2+} through the L-type calcium channels. After this, cardiac muscle tends to exhibit diad structures, rather than triads.

Excitation-contraction coupling in cardiac muscle cells occurs when an action potential is initiated by pacemaker cells in the sinoatrial node or atrioventricular node and conducted to all cells in the heart via gap junctions. The action potential travels along the surface membrane into T-tubules (the latter are not seen in all cardiac cell types) and the depolarization causes extracellular Ca^{2+} to enter the cell via L-type calcium channels and possibly sodium-calcium exchanger (NCX) during the early part of the plateau phase. Although this Ca^{2+} influx only count for about 10% of the Ca^{2+} needed for activation, it is relatively larger than that of skeletal muscle. This Ca^{2+} influx causes a small local increase in intracellular Ca^{2+}. The increase of intracellular Ca^{2+} is detected by RyR2 in the membrane of the sarcoplasmic reticulum, which releases Ca^{2+} in a positive feedback physiological response. This positive feedback is known as calcium-induced calcium release and gives rise to calcium sparks (Ca^{2+} sparks). The spatial and temporal summation of ~30,000 Ca^{2+} sparks gives a cell-wide increase in cytoplasmic calcium concentration. The increase in cytosolic calcium following the flow of calcium through the cell membrane and sarcoplasmic reticulum is moderated by calcium buffers, which bind a large proportion of intracellular calcium. As a result, a large increase in total calcium leads to a relatively small rise in free Ca^{2+}.

The cytoplasmic calcium binds to Troponin C, moving the tropomyosin complex off the actin binding site allowing the myosin head to bind to the actin filament. From this point on, the contractile mechanism is essentially the same as for skeletal muscle (above). Briefly, using ATP hydrolysis, the myosin head pulls the actin filament toward the centre of the sarcomere.

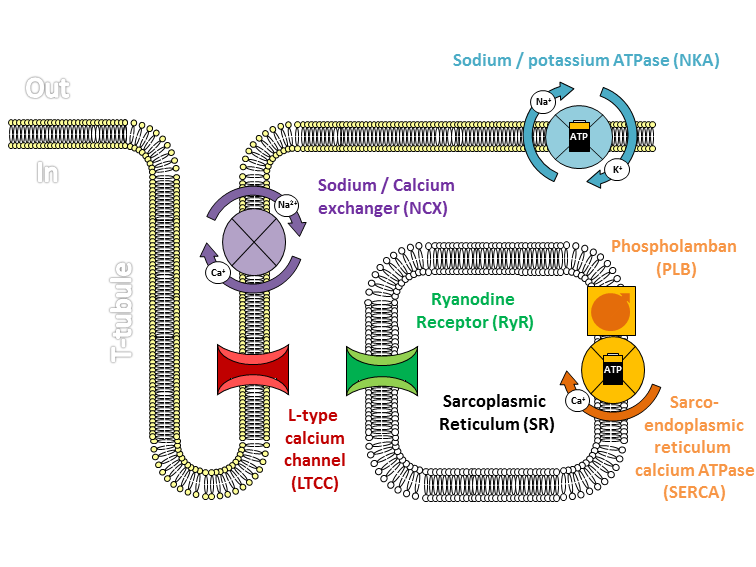
Key proteins involved in cardiac calcium cycling and excitation-contraction coupling

Following systole, intracellular calcium is taken up by the sarco/endoplasmic reticulum ATPase (SERCA) pump back into the sarcoplasmic reticulum ready for the next cycle to begin. Calcium is also ejected from the cell mainly by the sodium-calcium exchanger (NCX) and, to a lesser extent, a plasma membrane calcium ATPase. Some calcium is also taken up by the mitochondria. An enzyme, phospholamban, serves as a brake for SERCA. At low heart rates, phospholamban is active and slows down the activity of the ATPase so that Ca^{2+} does not have to leave the cell entirely. At high heart rates, phospholamban is phosphorylated and deactivated thus taking most Ca^{2+} from the cytoplasm back into the sarcoplasmic reticulum. Once again, calcium buffers moderate this fall in Ca^{2+}concentration, permitting a relatively small decrease in free Ca^{2+}concentration in response to a large change in total calcium. The falling Ca^{2+}concentration allows the troponin complex to dissociate from the actin filament thereby ending contraction. The heart relaxes, allowing the ventricles to fill with blood and begin the cardiac cycle again.

== Invertebrate ==
=== Circular and longitudinal muscles ===
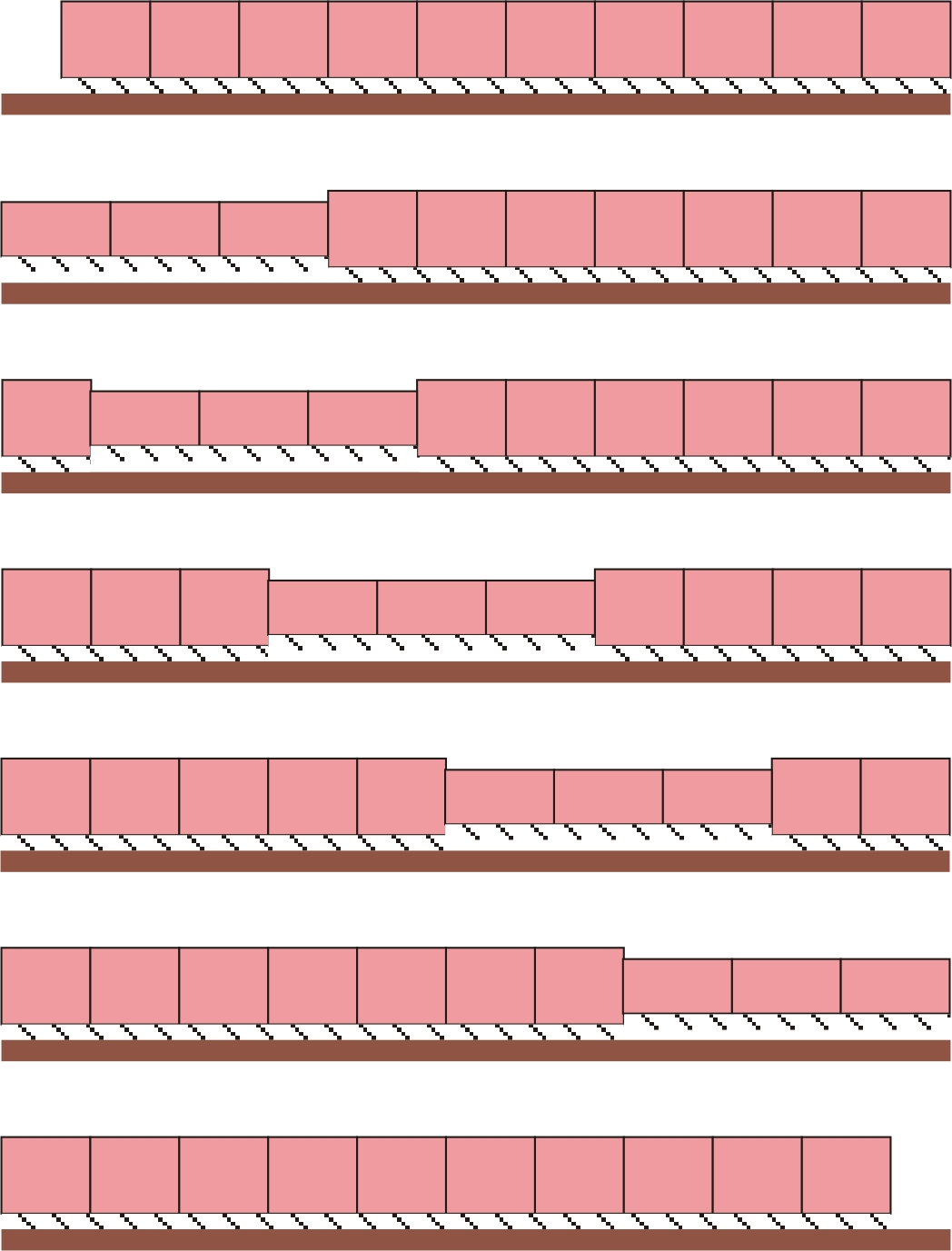
A simplified image showing earthworm movement via peristalsis

In annelids such as earthworms and leeches, circular and longitudinal muscles cells form the body wall of these animals and are responsible for their movement. In an earthworm that is moving through a soil, for example, contractions of circular and longitudinal muscles occur reciprocally while the coelomic fluid serves as a hydroskeleton by maintaining turgidity of the earthworm. When the circular muscles in the anterior segments contract, the anterior portion of animal's body begins to constrict radially, which pushes the incompressible coelomic fluid forward and increasing the length of the animal. As a result, the front end of the animal moves forward. As the front end of the earthworm becomes anchored and the circular muscles in the anterior segments become relaxed, a wave of longitudinal muscle contractions passes backwards, which pulls the rest of animal's trailing body forward. These alternating waves of circular and longitudinal contractions is called peristalsis, which underlies the creeping movement of earthworms.

=== Obliquely striated muscles ===
Invertebrates such as annelids, mollusks, and nematodes, possess obliquely striated muscles, which contain bands of thick and thin filaments that are arranged helically rather than transversely, like in vertebrate skeletal or cardiac muscles. In bivalves, the obliquely striated muscles can maintain tension over long periods without using too much energy. Bivalves use these muscles to keep their shells closed.

=== Asynchronous muscles ===
Asynchronous muscles power flight in most insect species. a: Wings b: Wing joint c: Dorsoventral muscles power the upstroke d: Dorsolongitudinal muscles (DLM) power the downstroke. The DLMs are oriented out of the page.

Advanced insects such as wasps, flies, bees, and beetles possess asynchronous muscles that constitute the flight muscles in these animals. These flight muscles are often called fibrillar muscles because they contain myofibrils that are thick and conspicuous. A remarkable feature of these muscles is that they do not require stimulation for each muscle contraction. Hence, they are called asynchronous muscles because the number of contractions in these muscles do not correspond (or synchronize) with the number of action potentials. For example, a wing muscle of a tethered fly may receive action potentials at a frequency of 3 Hz but it is able to beat at a frequency of 120 Hz. The high frequency beating is made possible because the muscles are connected to a resonant system, which is driven to a natural frequency of vibration.

== History ==
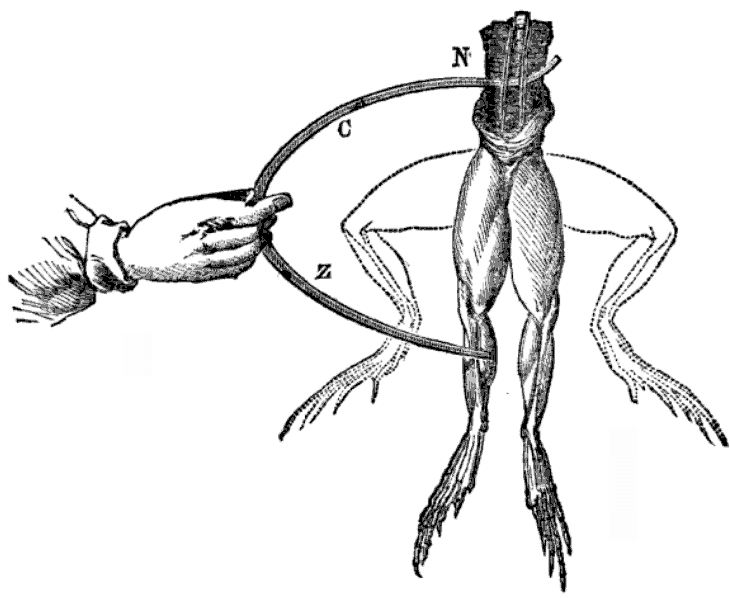
Electrodes touch a frog, and the legs twitch into the upward position

In 1780, Luigi Galvani discovered that the muscles of dead frogs' legs twitched when struck by an electrical spark. This was one of the first forays into the study of bioelectricity, a field that still studies the electrical patterns and signals in tissues such as nerves and muscles.

In 1952, the term excitation–contraction coupling was coined to describe the physiological process of converting an electrical stimulus to a mechanical response. This process is fundamental to muscle physiology, whereby the electrical stimulus is usually an action potential and the mechanical response is contraction. Excitation–contraction coupling can be dysregulated in many diseases. Though excitation–contraction coupling has been known for over half a century, it is still an active area of biomedical research. The general scheme is that an action potential arrives to depolarize the cell membrane. By mechanisms specific to the muscle type, this depolarization results in an increase in cytosolic calcium that is called a calcium transient. This increase in calcium activates calcium-sensitive contractile proteins that then use ATP to cause cell shortening.

The mechanism for muscle contraction eluded scientists for years and requires continued research and updating. The sliding filament theory was independently developed by Andrew F. Huxley and Rolf Niedergerke and by Hugh Huxley and Jean Hanson. Their findings were published as two consecutive papers published in the 22 May 1954 issue of Nature under the common theme "Structural Changes in Muscle During Contraction".

== See also ==
- Anatomical terms of motion
- Calcium-induced calcium release
- Cardiac action potential
- Cramp
- Dystonia
- Exercise physiology
- Fasciculation
- Hill's muscle model
- Hypnic jerk
- In vitro muscle testing
- Lombard's paradox
- Myoclonus
- Rigor mortis
- Spasm
- Uterine contraction
