= Sucrose gap =

The sucrose gap technique is used to create a conduction block in nerve or muscle fibers. A high concentration of sucrose is applied to the extracellular space, which prevents the correct opening and closing of sodium and potassium channels, increasing resistance between two groups of cells. It was originally developed by Robert Stämpfli for recording action potentials in nerve fibers, and is particularly useful for measuring irreversible or highly variable pharmacological modifications of channel properties since untreated regions of membrane can be pulled into the node between the sucrose regions.

== History ==
The sucrose gap technique was first introduced by Robert Stämpfli in 1954 who worked with Alan Hodgkin and Andrew Huxley between 1947 and 1949. From his research, Stämpfli determined that currents moving along nerve fibers can be measured more easily when there is a gap of high resistance that reduces the amount of conducting medium outside of the cell. Stämpfli observed many problems with the ways that were being used to measure membrane potential at the time. He experimented with a new method that he called the sucrose gap. The method was used to study action potentials in nerve fibers.

Huxley observed Stämpfli's method and agreed that it was useful and produced very few errors. The sucrose gap technique also contributed to Stämpfli's and Huxley's discovery of inhibitory junction potentials. Since its introduction, many improvements and alterations have been made to the technique. One modification of the single sucrose gap method was introduced by C.H.V. Hoyle in 1987. The double sucrose gap technique, which was first used by Rougier, Vassort, and Stämpfli to study cardiac cells in 1968, was improved by C. Leoty and J. Alix who introduced an improved chamber for the double sucrose gap with voltage clamp technique which eliminated external resistance from the node.

== Method ==
A classic sucrose gap technique is typically set up with three chambers that each contain a segment of the neuron or cells that are being studied. The test chamber contains a physiological solution, such as Krebs or Ringer's solution, which mimics the ion concentration and osmotic pressure of the cell's natural environment. Test drugs can also be added to this chamber to study the effect that they have on cellular function. Ag-AgCl or platinum wire electrodes are generally used for stimulating the cells in the test solution. The sucrose chamber (or gap) is the middle chamber that separates the two other chambers, or sections of the nerve fiber or cells. This chamber contains an isotonic sucrose solution of a high specific resistance. Specific resistance describes the ability of a material or solution to oppose electric current, so a sucrose solution of a high specific resistance is effective in electrically isolating the three chambers. The third chamber usually contains a KCl solution that mimics the intracellular solution. The high potassium concentration in this chamber depolarizes the immersed segment of the tissue, allowing potential differences to be measured between the two segments separated by the sucrose gap. Vaseline, silicon grease, or a silicon-vaseline mixture is used to seal the nerve or tissue in position and prevent diffusion of solution between the chambers. A pair of agar-bridged Ag-AgCl electrodes are placed in the test and KCl chambers to record the changes in membrane potential.

=== Single Sucrose Gap Technique ===
The single sucrose gap technique is used to study the electrical activity of cells. It is useful in the study of small nerve fibers and electrically connected cells such as smooth muscle cell. The method creates conduction block in a nerve or muscle fiber by introducing a gap of high resistance between two groups of cells. A nonionic sucrose solution is used to increase resistance in the extracellular area between the two groups. This allows all of the current originating on one side of the gap to flow to the other side only through the interior of the nerve or tissue. Changes in electrical potential between the two groups relative to each other can be measured and recorded.

=== Double Sucrose Gap Technique ===
Alterations have been made to the single sucrose gap technique. One modification is called the double sucrose gap technique. This is used to measure resistance and membrane potential at the same time. Two chambers containing sucrose solutions are used to isolate a node of the nerve or tissue, which is immersed in a physiological solution. The two ends of the nerve or tissue are depolarized by a solution rich in potassium ions. The potential differences between the node, or test chamber, and one of the potassium-rich chambers can be measured, while the potential in the node can be modified by the current degenerated between the other potassium-rich chamber and the node. The information that is obtained can be used, along with the Ohm's law equation, to determine the membrane resistance of the cells within the node. The double sucrose gap can be used as a voltage clamp as well. When used with proper electronics, the double sucrose gap can be used to voltage clamp the membrane potential of the nerve or tissue segment contained in the test chamber.

== Advantages and limitations ==
=== Advantages ===
The sucrose gap technique allows ion currents to be measured in multicellular tissues. Although voltage clamp and patch clamp methods are also effective in studying the functions of neurons, the sucrose gap technique is easier to perform and less expensive. Furthermore, the sucrose gap technique can provide stable recordings from small cells, such as nerve fibers or smooth muscle cells, for an extended period of time. It is very complicated, however, to achieve similar measurements with intracellular or patch-clamp electrodes because they can physically damage small axons or cells. Because of the arrangement of the sucrose gap chambers, the technique of stimulating the neuron or cell is simple and reliable. This method is also useful in studying the changes in membrane potential in response to different pharmacologically active agents, which can be introduced in the test chamber.

=== Limitations ===
A major limitation of the single sucrose gap is that it cannot determine the real values of the membrane potential and action potential amplitudes. It can only measure the relative changes in the potential between the regions separated by the sucrose solution because of the shunting effect. Double sucrose gap, however, can measure the membrane potential and resistance. Another limitation is that membrane potentials cannot be obtained from tissues where there is no electrical coupling between the cells (i.e. when the spatial constant, λ, is close to zero). Also, the sucrose solution, which has a low ionic concentration, can deplete the exposed cells of vital intracellular ions such as sodium and potassium, which can affect their viability. This can cause the membrane to become hyperpolarized and affect the conduction of action potentials along the cell. Despite these limitations, the many advantages of the sucrose gap method makes it a useful and reliable technique in neuroscience studies.

== Applications ==
The sucrose-gap technique is used to record membrane activities from myelinated nerves, unmyelinated nerves, smooth muscle, and cardiac muscle. Along with microelectrode methods and patch-clamp methods, the sucrose gap is often used by experimenters to study the nervous system and can serve as an effective method to investigate the effects of drugs on membrane activities. Studies on the effects of choline, acetylcholine, and carbachol on the resting potentials of the superior cervical ganglion in rabbits were conducted using the sucrose-gap method. The recording of membrane potentials in the superior cervical ganglion was made simple with the sucrose-gap method as it allows for separated depolarizing of the ganglion and the internal carotid nerve.

The sucrose-gap technique has been applied to determine the relation between external potassium concentration and the membrane potential of smooth muscle cells using guinea-pig ureters. It has also been used to rectify inaccurate membrane potential measurements resulting from leakage currents through the membrane and extracellular resistance. Correction of an inaccurate membrane current reading is also possible through utilization of the sucrose-gap method.

Developments in the sucrose-gap method have led to double sucrose-gap techniques. A double sucrose-gap is generally advantageous when used to electrically isolate smaller segments of nerve fibers than would be possible with a single sucrose-gap, as was done in studies on membrane potentials and currents in sheep and calf ventricular muscle fibers. The double sucrose-gap technique is also utilized over the single sucrose-gap to study cardiac muscle, where it allows for clearer resolution of early currents, those occurring within the first 10-100 milliseconds of depolarization.
