= REEP5 =

Protein-coding gene in the species Homo sapiens

Identifiers
- Aliases: REEP5, C5orf18, D5S346, DP1, TB2, YOP1, Yip2e, receptor accessory protein 5, POB16
- External IDs: OMIM: 125265; MGI: 1270152; GeneCards: REEP5

Gene location (Human)
Chr.	Chromosome 5 (human)
Band	5q22.2	Start	112,876,385 bp
Band	5q22.2	End	112,922,289 bp

Gene location (Mouse)
Chr.	Chromosome 18 (mouse)
Band	18|18 B1	Start	34,477,938 bp
Band	18|18 B1	End	34,507,123 bp
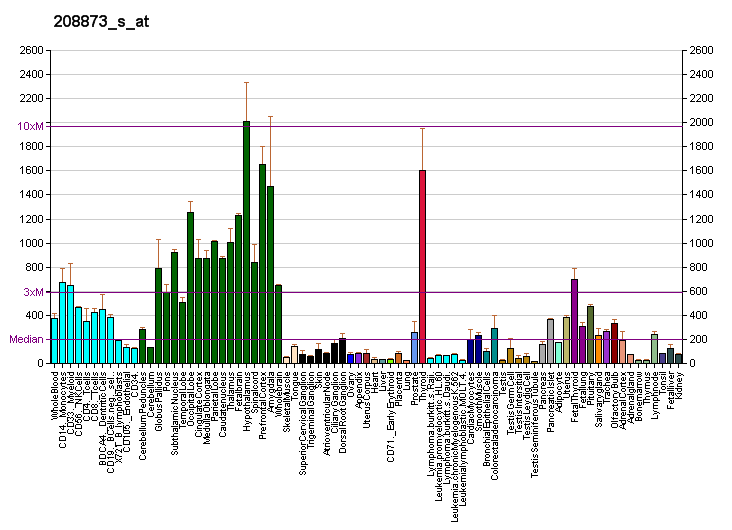
RNA expression pattern
Bgee	Human / Mouse (ortholog); Top expressed in: middle temporal gyrus; lateral nuclear group of thalamus; endothelial cell; Brodmann area 23; pons; primary visual cortex; spinal ganglia; orbitofrontal cortex; superior vestibular nucleus; parietal lobe / Top expressed in: lacrimal gland; salivary gland; parotid gland; submandibular gland; endothelial cell of lymphatic vessel; ascending aorta; lactiferous gland; subcutaneous adipose tissue; choroid plexus of fourth ventricle; white adipose tissue; More reference expression data
BioGPS	More reference expression data
Gene ontology
Molecular function	protein binding; molecular function
Cellular component	integral component of membrane; membrane; endoplasmic reticulum; endoplasmic reticulum tubular network
Biological process	biological process
Sources:Amigo / QuickGO
Orthologs
Databases	NCBI: entry; OMA: entry
Species	Human	Mouse
Entrez	7905	13476
Ensembl	ENSG00000129625	ENSMUSG00000005873
UniProt	Q00765	Q60870
RefSeq (mRNA)	NM_005669	NM_007874
RefSeq (protein)	NP_005660	n/a
Location (UCSC)	Chr 5: 112.88 – 112.92 Mb	Chr 18: 34.48 – 34.51 Mb
PubMed search
- Wikidata
View/Edit Human	View/Edit Mouse

Receptor expression-enhancing protein 5 is a protein that in humans is encoded by the REEP5 gene. Receptor Expression Enhancing Protein is a protein encoded for in Humans by the REEP5 gene.

== Gene ==
REEP5 is located on chromosome 5 between base pairs 112876385 to 112922289 on the minus strand. The gene includes five exons. The genes DCP2 and SRP19 are located upstream and downstream of REEP5 in humans.

== Protein ==
The protein is a member of the REEP family, which generally facilitate intracellular trafficking through alterations to the endoplasmic reticulum, and which have the ability to enhance activity of G-protein coupled receptors. The human protein is 189 amino acids in length, containing two transmembrane regions and one named region- TB2_DP1_HVA22, The pre-modification protein mass is 21.5 kdal. Compared to the SwissProt collection of human proteins, REEP5 is composed of normal percentages of all amino acids. Aside from a long stretch of electrically neutral amino acids, no significant patterns appear. A second isoform exists in humans, and is 131 amino acids in length as the result of a change after the 117th amino acid. Most of the fifth exon is not included.

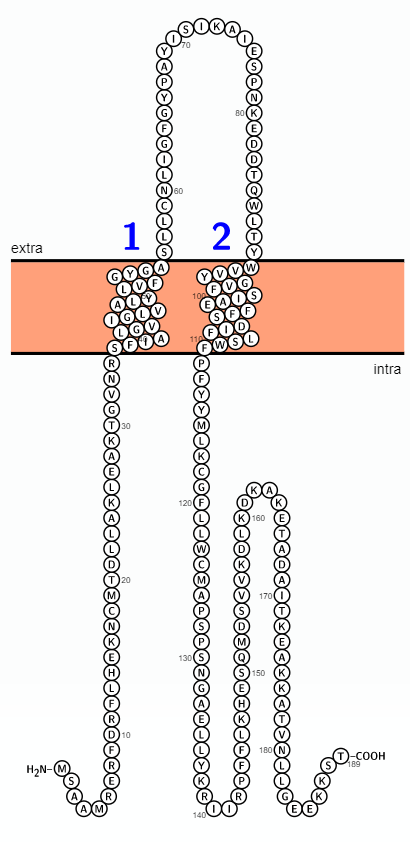
Protein Topology of the Human REEP5 protein as predicted by PROTTER

== Regulation ==
=== Gene level ===
==== Tissue expression ====
REEP5 is expressed across a number of tissues at a relatively high level, with at least 20 Reads Per Kilobase of transcript, per Million mapped reads appearing in adrenal, fat, gall bladder, heart, kidney, prostate, lung, and urinary bladder tissues. Expression is even more highly elevated in brain and thyroid tissues.

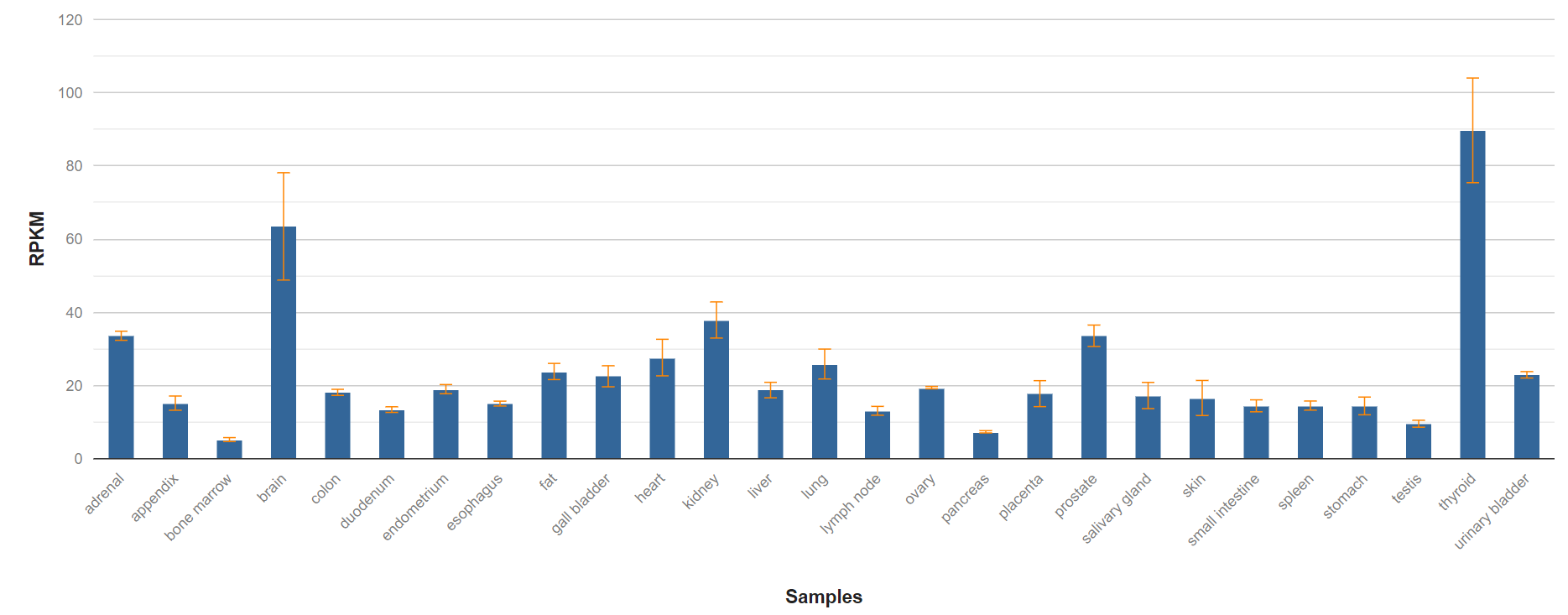
HPA RNA-sequencing data for REEP5 showing high expression in the brain and thyroid.

==== Transcription factors ====
EGR/Nerve growth factor is a transcription factor with a potential binding site in the REEP5 promoter, which promotes neural plasticity, and therefore potentially provides an explanation for elevated levels of Receptor Expression Enhancing Protein 5 in the brain.

Additionally, two transcription factors related to heart development and function have possible binding sites in the promoter. Transcription Box 20 (TBX20) is related to heart development, with protein deficiencies linked to poor heart function in adult mice, and death in infants before gestation. MyoD is a Myogenic regulator which has been detected in the embryonic hearts of some birds in Purkinje cells, which are related to contractile function.

=== Protein level ===
At the sub cellular level, REEP5 is expressed in the endoplasmic reticulum. Immunochemical staining localizes it here.

A number of post-translational modifications are computationally predicted in humans and close orthologs. Acetylation of the second amino acid was predicted. Phosphorylation of the 150th amino acid is predicted in Humans, Mice and Chickens. O-GlcNac additions are also predicted at sites 128, 188, and 189. Sumoylation sites are predicted at amino acids 147, 175, 186, and 187. Propeptide cleavage was detected at amino acid 11. Glycation was predicted at amino acids 16, 117, 164, 186, and 187.

== Homology ==
=== Paralogs ===
REEP5 has five paralogs in humans; REEP1, REEP2, REEP3, REEP4, and REEP6.

REEP5 Human Paralogs
Paralog Name	Accession number	Sequence Identity	Expected Millions of Years since divergence
REEP6	NP_612402.1	54%	563.16
REEP4	AAH50622	25%	1325.64
REEP1	NP_001303894.1	24.6%	1341.62
REEP3	AAT70686.1	22.7%	1421.20
REEP2	NP_057690.2	15.6%	1792.58

=== Orthologs ===
REEP5 has orthologs as far removed from humans as Symbiodinium microadriacticum, a protist species. Sequence identity is high for vertebrates, but decreases significantly outside of this group. The DP1/TB2/HVA22 region is well conserved compared to the two transmembrane regions.

Selected Orthologs
Organism	Date of Divergence (millions of years ago)	Taxonomic group	Sequence Accession Number	Sequence identity	e-value
Homo sapiens	NA	Mammalia	NP_005660.4	100%	NA
Mus musculus	89	Mammalia	N_031900.3	93.7%	4 × 10^{−134}
Danio rerio	433	Actinopterygii	NP_956352.1	72.0%	7 × 10^{−104}
Drosophila melanogaster	736	Insecta	NP_001188928.1	38.2%	9 × 10^{−57}
Jaminaea rosea	1017	Exbasidiomycetes	XP_025360265	31.9%	5 × 10^{−40}
Rhodotorula graminis WP1	1105	Microbotryomycetes	XP_018269688.1	31.2%	7 × 10^{−35}
Citrus unshiu	1275	Magnoliopsida	Gay51937.1	25.2%	4 × 10^{−26}
Symbiodinium microadriacticum	1552	Dinophyceae	OLQ12882.1	16.2%	5 × 10^{−16}

=== Evolutionary Rate ===
The evolutionary rate of the REEP5 protein is moderately high, falling between that of cytochrome c and fibrinogen alpha. Neutral mutations are expected to occur around once per one million years.

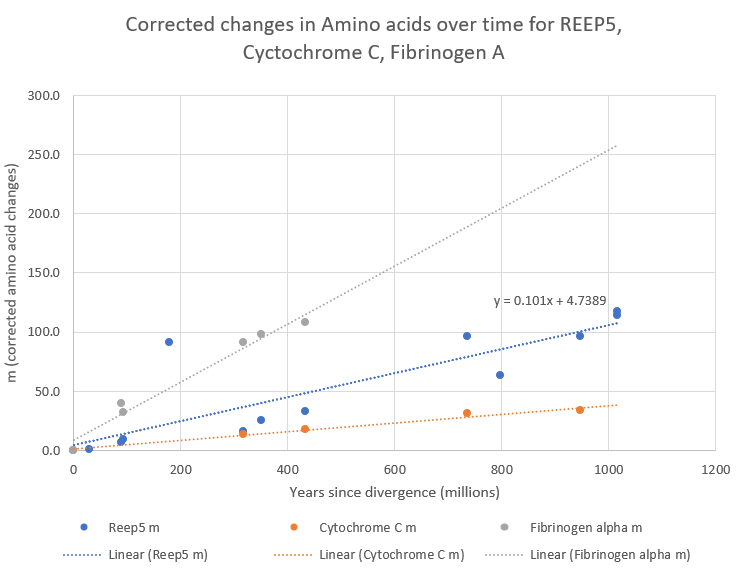
Graph showing the evolutionary rate of REEP5 in comparison to Cytochrome C and Fibrinogen Alpha

== Interacting partners ==
REEP5 interacts with a number of proteins, including Regulator of G Protein signalling 2, which was detected using Yeast 2 Hybridization. RGS2 plays a role in G protein signalling 2 pathways and the contraction of smooth muscle tissues. Derlin 2 (Derl2) interacts with REEP5 as detected by anti-tag coimmunoprecipation and degrades misfolded glycoproteins in the endoplasmic reticulum. Cholinergic Receptor Muscarinic 5 was detected as an interactant by ubiquitin reconstruction. CHRM5 binds acetylcholine, and can impact the function of the central and peripheral nervous systems.

Regulator of G Protein Signaling 2 was also detected with Yeast 2 Hybridization and is a regulator of G-protein receptor which may be involved with the contraction of smooth vascular muscle.

Four proteins were experimentally detected across several papers. Three of them, Atlastin GTPase 1, Atlastin GTPase 2, and Zinc Finger FYVE-Type Containing 27 are related to the structuring of the endoplasmic reticulum (tubules in particular), the development of axons, or neuron growth. The fourth is REEP6, which is responsible for transporting receptors to the cell surface, as well as regulating endoplasmic reticulum structure.

=== SARS-CoV-2 ===
REEP5 is one of many human proteins which interacts with SARS-CoV-2. Specifically, the coronavirus protein P0DTC5, which appears in the intermediate compartment between the endoplasmic reticulum and golgi apparatus, interacts with REEP5. P0DTC5 is a viral envelope protein which is crucial to viral morphogenesis, making it possible that REEP5 is related in someway to packaging or release of the virus from human cells.

== Clinical significance ==
Research has linked REEP5 to several diseases and disorders.

In colon cancer, expression of REEP5 enhances activity of CXCR1, a protein receptor which contributes to the growth and spread of cancer cells. Researchers have found that under expression of REEP5 reduces the efficiency of CXRC1, and reduces the ability of lung cancer cells to metastasize. This provides both a potential target for cancer therapy and further evidence of REEP5 having function as a protein which increases activity of other receptor proteins. Another type of cancer related to REEP5 is colon cancer, in which the protein normally interacts with and neutralizes HCCR1, a protein which would otherwise interfere with P53 and contribute to the progression of cancer.

REEP5 has also been linked to heart disorders, and research into the connection has revealed that it helps organize the junctional Sarcoplasmic Reticulum in myocytes. REEP5 aligns the junctional SR to T-tubules, which promotes effective release of Calcium ions. When protein function is disrupted the junction becomes misaligned and Calcium ion release becomes less effective. Given the importance of Calcium ions to the muscle contractions which power the heart, targeting REEP5 has the potential to be a therapeutic option in some disorders.

Additionally, there is some statistical evidence linking certain SNPs found within REEP5 mRNA to Major Depressive Disorder. However, a biological mechanism has not been confirmed, and the study only looked at a limited population.
