= Hugh Huxley =

English biologist (1924–2013)

Hugh Huxley MBE FRS
- Born: Hugh Esmor Huxley; 25 February 1924; Birkenhead, Cheshire, England
- Died: 25 July 2013 (aged 89); Woods Hole, Massachusetts, US
- Education: Christ's College, Cambridge; Cambridge University (PhD)
- Known for: Muscle contraction Muscle proteins
- Spouse: Frances Huxley
- Awards: William Bate Hardy Prize (1966); Louisa Gross Horwitz Prize (1971); Royal Medal (1977); E.B. Wilson Medal (1983); Albert Einstein World Award of Science (1987); Franklin Medal (1990); Copley Medal (1997)
- Scientific career
- Fields: Molecular Biologist
- Workplaces: Massachusetts Institute of Technology; University College London; MRC Laboratory of Molecular Biology; Brandeis University
- Doctoral advisor: John Kendrew
- Military career
- Allegiance: United Kingdom
- Branch: Royal Air Force (RAFVR)
- Service years: 1943–1947
- Rank: Flight Lieutenant
- Conflicts: Second World War
- Awards: Member of the Order of the British Empire (MBE, Military Division)

Hugh Esmor Huxley (25 February 1924 – 25 July 2013) was a British molecular biologist who made important discoveries in the physiology of muscle. He was a graduate in physics from Christ's College, Cambridge. However, his education was interrupted for five years by the Second World War, during which he served in the Royal Air Force. His contribution to development of radar earned him an MBE.

Huxley was the first PhD student of Laboratory of Molecular Biology of the Medical Research Council at Cambridge, where he worked on X-ray diffraction studies on muscle fibres. In the 1950s he was one of the first to use electron microscopy to study biological specimens. During his postdoctoral at Massachusetts Institute of Technology, he, with fellow researcher Jean Hanson, discovered the underlying principle of muscle movement, popularised as the sliding filament theory in 1954. After 15 years of research, he proposed the "swinging cross-bridge hypothesis" in 1969, which became modern understanding of the molecular basis of muscle contraction, and much of other cellular motility.

Huxley worked at University College London for seven years, and at Laboratory of Molecular Biology for fifteen years, where he was its Deputy Director from 1979. Between 1987 and 1997, he was professor at Brandeis University in Massachusetts, where he spent the rest of his life as emeritus professor.

== Education ==
Huxley studied physics at Christ's College, Cambridge in 1941. During his second year, his education was interrupted by the Second World War, and he joined the Royal Air Force as a radar officer. He worked on the development of radar equipment during 1943 to 1947, for which he was later honoured a Member of the Order of the British Empire (MBE). His expertise in mechanical and electrical devices became useful throughout his scientific career. After completing his service, he returned to Cambridge for his final year, and he received his BA in physics in 1948. The war had completely diminished his interest in physics, particularly on the horrors of atomic bombings of Hiroshima and Nagasaki. He therefore joined Cambridge University to become the first PhD student in a newly formed Laboratory of Molecular Biology, then a small Medical Research Council (MRC) unit founded by Max Perutz and John Kendrew, who supervised him. (The LMB was then a small "hut" near the famous Cavendish Laboratory.) He was initially given X-ray analysis of proteins, but he turned to muscle. (The protein study was given to the other student Francis Crick, of the eventual DNA fame.) From there he earned his PhD in 1952 in molecular biology. For his thesis titled Investigations in Biological Structures by X-Ray Methods. The Structure of Muscle, he used low-angle, X-ray scattering of live muscle fibers.

== Career ==
Following his PhD, Huxley continued research on the structure and function of muscle. Since Cambridge did not have electron microscopy, which began to be used for biological studies at the time, he went to Massachusetts Institute of Technology as a postdoctoral fellow on a Commonwealth Fellowship in late summer of 1952. He work in F. O. Schmitt's laboratory where he was joined by Jean Hanson in 1953. Their collaboration proved to be fruitful as they discovered the so-called "sliding filament theory" of muscle contraction. Their publication in the 22 May 1954 issue of Nature became a landmark in muscle physiology. He returned to MRC unit of Cambridge in the late spring of 1954. Using X-ray diffraction he found the molecular interaction in the muscle fibres. The LMB was then equipped with electron microscope, but still had technical issues. Knowing his potential the University College London appointed him to the faculty, and moved there to join Bernard Katz's biophysics department in 1955. For his purpose he was bought a new electron microscope with fund from the Wellcome Trust. His innovative contribution was making a modified version of thin-sectioning microtome, by which he could make histological sections of only 100–150 Å in thickness. Based on his LMB X-ray diffraction images, the new technique immediately helped him to establish the cross-bridge concept (interaction site of the muscle proteins, myosin and actin). As the MRC unit was enlarged he was invited back in 1962, with a research fellowship at King's College for five years and then a more permanent one at Churchill College. He became the joint Head of the Structural Studies Division of the LMB in 1975, and its Deputy Director in 1979. In 1969, on the basis of his work over more than 15 years, he finally formulated the "swinging cross-bridge hypothesis" of muscle contraction, which is the molecular basis of muscle contraction. The concept itself became directly fundamental to other types of cell motility. In 1987 he joined the biology faculty at Brandeis University in Waltham, Massachusetts, where he also served as Director of the Rosenstiel Basic Medical Sciences Research Center, and becoming emeritus from 1997 until his death.

== Awards and honours ==
He was made an MBE in 1948. He was elected member of Fellow of the Royal Society in 1960 (the youngest member at that time) and also won one of its Royal Medals in 1977 and its Copley Medal in 1997. He was awarded the Louisa Gross Horwitz Prize from Columbia University in 1971. The U.S. National Academy of Sciences appointed him as a Foreign Associate in 1978. He also received the William Bate Hardy Prize in 1966, Antonio Feltrinelli Prize, E. B. Wilson Medal of the American Society for Cell Biology in 1983, and the Franklin Medal in 1990. He was conferred the Albert Einstein World Award of Science in 1987 for his contributions to molecular biology, notably his classic work in the field of muscle biology.

Huxley was a Distinguished Supporter of the British Humanist Association. He was among the 43 scientists and philosophers who signed the BHA letter in March 2002 to Prime Minister Tony Blair deploring the teaching of creationism in schools. He also advocated Charles Darwin’s birthday as public holiday, and curricular reforms in elementary science education.

In 1981, Huxley was named an honorary member of the American Association for Anatomy.

== Death ==
Huxley died of heart attack on 25 July 2013 in his home in Woods Hole, Massachusetts. He is survived by his wife, Frances, his daughter, Olwen, and stepchildren, Bill, Glenway, and Amy Fripp.
