= Jean Hanson =

British zoologist and biophysicist

- Born: Emmeline Jean Hanson; 14 November 1919; Newhall, Derbyshire, England
- Died: 10 August 1973 (aged 53); London, England
- Education: Bedford College, University of London; King's College London
- Known for: Sliding filament theory
- Scientific career
- Fields: Biophysics, Zoology
- Institutions: King's College London; Massachusetts Institute of Technology

Emmeline Jean Hanson FRS (14 November 1919 – 10 August 1973) was a biophysicist and zoologist known for her contributions to muscle research. Hanson gained her PhD in zoology from Bedford College, University of London before spending the majority of her career at a biophysics research unit at King's College London, where she was a founder member, and later its second Head. While working at Massachusetts Institute of Technology, she, with Hugh Huxley, discovered the mechanism of movement of muscle fibre in 1954, which came to known as "sliding filament theory". This was a groundbreaking research in muscle physiology, and for this BBC nicknamed her "Mrs Muscle" on the 50th anniversary of the discovery.

== Early life ==
Hanson was born on 14 November 1919 in Newhall, Derbyshire, England, the only child of Tom and Emily Hanson. Her parents were both school teachers. She was raised solely by her mother after her father died of a brain tumour soon after her birth. Through her mother's active encouragement, Hanson developed a keen interest in music and the arts. She attended the Girl's High School in Burton upon Trent from 1930 to 1938. At around the age of fifteen, while attending the Girl's High School, she developed her interest in biology. At the end of sixth form, she took the Higher School Certificate gaining distinction in English, botany and zoology. She was awarded a scholarship to attend Bedford College London after taking its entrance examination in botany, zoology and physiology.

Hanson began at Bedford College in 1938, taking its Intermediate Examination in zoology, botany, chemistry and physiology the following year, graduating with first-class honours in zoology with a minor in botany in 1941. As a post-graduate research student, Hanson began studying the vascular system of annelids. However this research was interrupted between 1942–44 when Bedford College were evacuated to Cambridge due to World War II. During two years at Cambridge, she worked at the Strangeways Laboratory on the histogenesis and differentiation of epidermis. Between 1944 and 1948 she worked as demonstrator in zoology.

== Career ==
Jean Hanson joined the King's College London in 1948 in the newly established Biophysics Department. The department was under John Randall, who invited her to establish the biological section. She worked on muscle fibres and obtained her PhD in 1951. In February 1953 she went to Massachusetts Institute of Technology with a one-year Rockefeller Fellowship and joined a fellow English postdoc Hugh Huxley to work in F. O. Schmitt's laboratory. Together they discovered the so-called "sliding filament theory", the underpinning idea on muscle contraction. Their publication in the 22 May 1954 issue of Nature became a landmark in muscle physiology. They provided the strong evidence for the theory in 1956, in which they showed electron microscopic details of the shortening and elongation of muscle fibres against each other. Even then the theory was not easily embraced, even in 1960 at a symposium of biomacromolecules held in Pittsburgh, Pasadena, scientists including the Nobel laureate Paul Flory argued against the sliding process. Hanson was remembered reacting, "I know I cannot explain the mechanism yet, but the sliding is a fact." After their work in US, Hanson and Huxley decided to separate their lines of muscle research, and Hanson took up those of invertebrate animals. In 1966 she became full Professor of Biology at King's. In 1970, she succeeded Randall as Director of the Biophysics Unit, where she remained until her death in 1973.

== Honours ==
Jean Hanson was elected a Fellow of the Royal Society in 1967.

== Personal life and death ==
Jean Hanson was very unlike the other members of the King's, who were famous for their antagonism among themselves. She was generous, open-minded, and most of all, eager to help young researchers. She was known as 'Jean' to all. (She never used her first name, even in her publications.) Huxley noted that since their research area overlapped there could have been serious conflict as they worked in different institutes. Foreseeing this Hanson chose to work only in invertebrate animals, and to such sensible and modest decision Huxley remarked: Would that it was always so!

She died in London on 10 August 1973 from a rare brain infection, meningococcal septicaemia.
