= Interference microscopy =

Use of optical interference patterns to visualize small objects

Interference microscopy involves measurements of differences in the path between two beams of light that have been split. The interacting waves of the two beams constructively or destructively interfere, which can be measured via interferometry to visualize microscopic objects.

Interference microscopy enables visualization and measurement of transparent or nearly transparent specimens, such as living cells or thin films, without the need for staining by converting phase shifts in light into differences in amplitude or contrast visible to the observer.

In materials science and surface metrology, interference microscopy is also widely used to characterize surface topography and quantify micro-scale surface irregularities, with vertical resolutions on the order of nanometers achievable through multi-beam interference techniques.

Types include:

- Classical interference microscopy
- Differential interference contrast microscopy
- Fluorescence interference contrast microscopy
- Interference reflection microscopy

== See also ==
- Phase contrast microscopy
