= Cardiac excitation-contraction coupling =

Cardiac excitation-contraction coupling (Cardiac EC coupling) describes the series of events, from the production of an electrical impulse (action potential) to the contraction of muscles in the heart. This process is of vital importance as it allows for the heart to beat in a controlled manner, without the need for conscious input. EC coupling results in the sequential contraction of the heart muscles that allows blood to be pumped, first to the lungs (pulmonary circulation) and then around the rest of the body (systemic circulation) at a rate between 60 and 100 beats every minute, when the body is at rest. This rate can be altered, however, by nerves that work to either increase heart rate (sympathetic nerves) or decrease it (parasympathetic nerves), as the body's oxygen demands change. Ultimately, muscle contraction revolves around a charged atom (ion), calcium (Ca^{2+}), which is responsible for converting the electrical energy of the action potential into mechanical energy (contraction) of the muscle. This is achieved in a region of the muscle cell, called the transverse tubule during a process known as calcium induced calcium release.

== Initiation ==
Located in the wall of the right atrium is a group of specialised cells, called the Sinoatrial node (SAN). These cells, unlike most other cells within the heart, can spontaneously produce action potentials. These action potentials travel along the cell membrane (sarcolemma), as impulses, passing from one cell to the next through channels, in structures known as gap junctions.

== Calcium-induced calcium release ==
Certain regions of the sarcolemma penetrate deep into the cell. These are known as transverse-tubules (t-tubules), which are also found in skeletal muscle cells and allow for the action potential to travel into the centre of the cell. Special proteins called L-type calcium channels (also known as dihydropyridine receptors (DHPR)) are located on the t-tubule membrane and are activated by the action potential. Activated DHPRs open, forming a channel that allows Ca^{2+} to pass into the cell. This increase in Ca^{2+} then binds to and activates another receptor, called a type 2 ryanodine receptor (RyR2), located on the membrane of a structure known as the sarcoplasmic reticulum (SR). The sarcoplasmic reticulum is a Ca^{2+} storehouse within the cell and is located very close to the T-tubule. Activation of RyR2 causes it to open, releasing even more Ca^{2+} into the cell. This release of calcium is called a calcium spark. The initial flow of Ca^{2+} into the cell causes a larger release of Ca^{2+} within the cell, so therefore the process is called calcium induced calcium release (CICR).

== Muscle Contraction ==
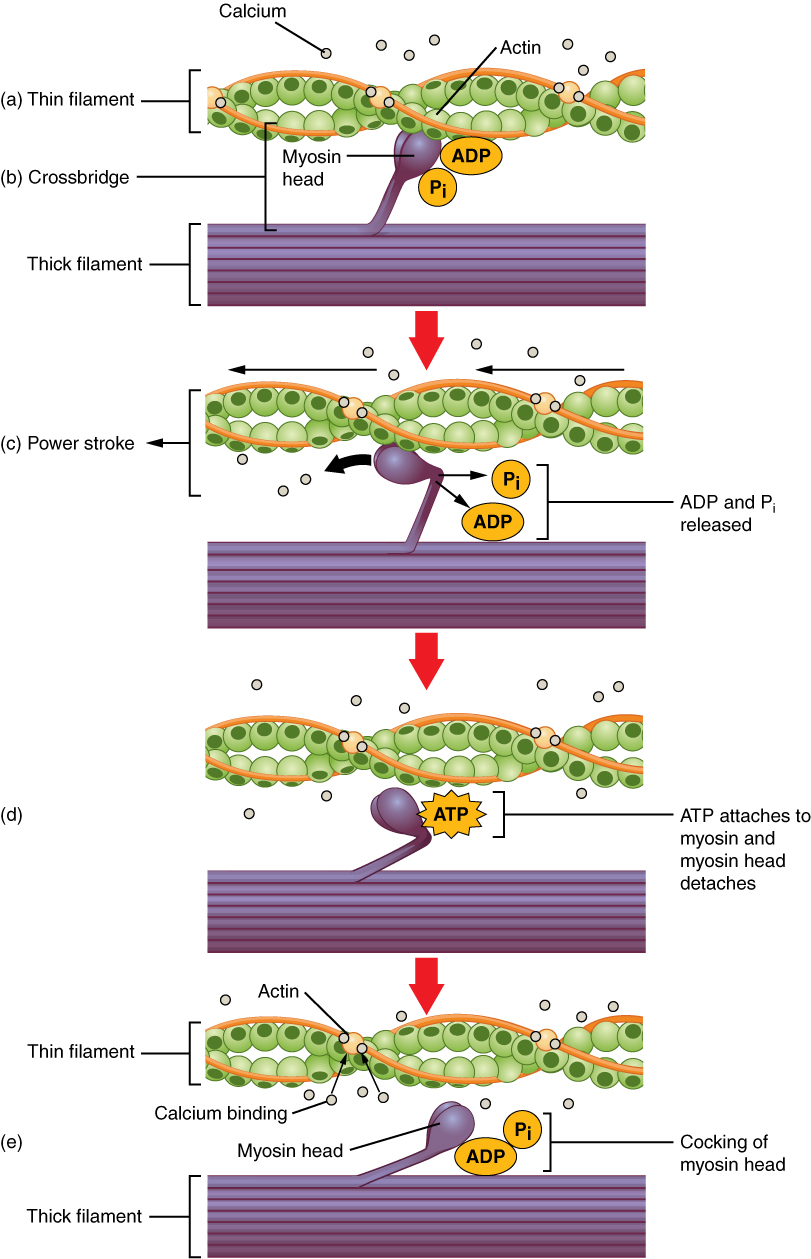
Figure 1: Calcium binding to troponin, exposes sites on the actin filaments, to which myosin binds. Using ATP, myosin moves the actin along. The myosin releases the actin, resets itself and binds to another actin binding site.

The increase in Ca^{2+}, produced by CICR, now does two things. Firstly, it binds to the intracellular side of the DHPR, signalling the channels to close and preventing further influx of Ca^{2+} into the cell. Secondly Ca^{2+} indirectly activates proteins, called myofilaments, resulting in muscle contraction. The two main myofilaments in cardiac (and skeletal) muscle are actin and myosin. Ca^{2+} binds to a protein called troponin, which is bound to the actin filament. This binding causes a shape change in the troponin which exposes areas on the actin, to which the head of the myosin filament binds. The binding of the myosin head to actin is known as a cross-bridge. A molecule, called adenosine triphosphate (ATP) which is produced by an intracellular structure called a mitochondrion, is then used, as a source of energy, to help move the myosin head, carrying the actin. As a result, the actin slides across the myosin filament shortening the muscle. This is called a power stroke. Myosin then detaches from the actin and resets itself back to its original position, binding to another part of the actin and producing another power stroke, shortening the muscle further. This process continues, with the myosin head moving in a motion similar to that of an oar rowing a boat, until the Ca^{2+} level within the cell decreases (see figure 1).

== Termination of contraction ==
Contraction ends when the Ca^{2+} is removed from the cell. When this happens, the troponin changes back to its original shape, blocking the binding sites on actin and preventing the formation of crossbridges. This decrease in Ca^{2+} within the cell is brought about by a variety of proteins, known collectively as ion transporters. The main pumps involved are: the sarcoplasmic reticulum Ca^{2+}-ATPase, which pumps Ca^{2+} back into the SR, the Sarcolemmal sodium-calcium exchanger, which pumps one Ca^{2+} out of the cell, in exchange for 3 sodium ions being pumped into the cell, the Sarcolemmal Ca^{2+}-ATPase, which uses ATP to pump Ca^{2+} directly out of the cell and the Mitochondrial Ca^{2+} Uniport system, which pumps Ca^{2+} into the mitochondria.

== Heart rate ==
Sympathetic nerves work by releasing a protein (neurotransmitter) called noradrenaline which binds to a specific receptor (beta 1 adrenoceptor) located in the sarcolemma and the t-tubule membrane of cardiac cells. This activates a protein, called a G-protein and results in a series of reactions (known as a cyclic AMP pathway) that leads to the production of a molecule called cAMP (cyclic adenosine monophosphate). In the SAN cAMP binds to an ion channel involved in action potential initiation, speeding up the production of the action potential (see sinoatrial node for more detail). cAMP also, activates a protein called protein kinase A (PKA). PKA affects both the L-type calcium channels (also known as dihydropyridine receptors (DHPR)) and RyR, increasing the rise in Ca ^{2+} within the contractile cells and therefore increasing rate of muscle contraction. PKA also affects the myofilaments as well as a protein called phospholamban (PLB; see sarcoplasmic reticulum for more details), speeding up the rate of Ca^{2+}decline in the cell and so speeding up muscle relaxation.

Parasympathetic nerves work by releasing a neurotransmitter called acetylcholine (ACh) which binds to specific receptor (M2 muscarinic receptor) on the sarcolemma of both SAN cells and ventricular cells. This again activates a G-protein. However this G-protein works by inhibiting, the cAMP pathway, therefore, preventing the sympathetic nervous system from increasing heart rate. As well as this, in the SAN, the G-protein activates specific potassium channel, that opposes action potential initiation (see SAN for more details), thus slowing heart rate.
