= Diad =

Muscular contraction-related structure in tissue

Within the muscle tissue of animals and humans, contraction and relaxation of the muscle cells (myocytes) is a highly regulated and rhythmic process. In cardiomyocytes, or cardiac muscle cells, muscular contraction takes place due to movement at a structure referred to as the diad, sometimes spelled "dyad." The diad is the connection of transverse-tubules (t-tubules) and the junctional sarcoplasmic reticulum (jSR). Like skeletal muscle contractions, Calcium (Ca^{2+}) ions are required for polarization and depolarization through a voltage-gated calcium channel. The rapid influx of calcium into the cell signals for the cells to contract. When the calcium intake travels through an entire muscle, it will trigger a united muscular contraction. This process is known as excitation-contraction coupling. This contraction pushes blood inside the heart and from the heart to other regions of the body.

== Myocyte anatomy ==
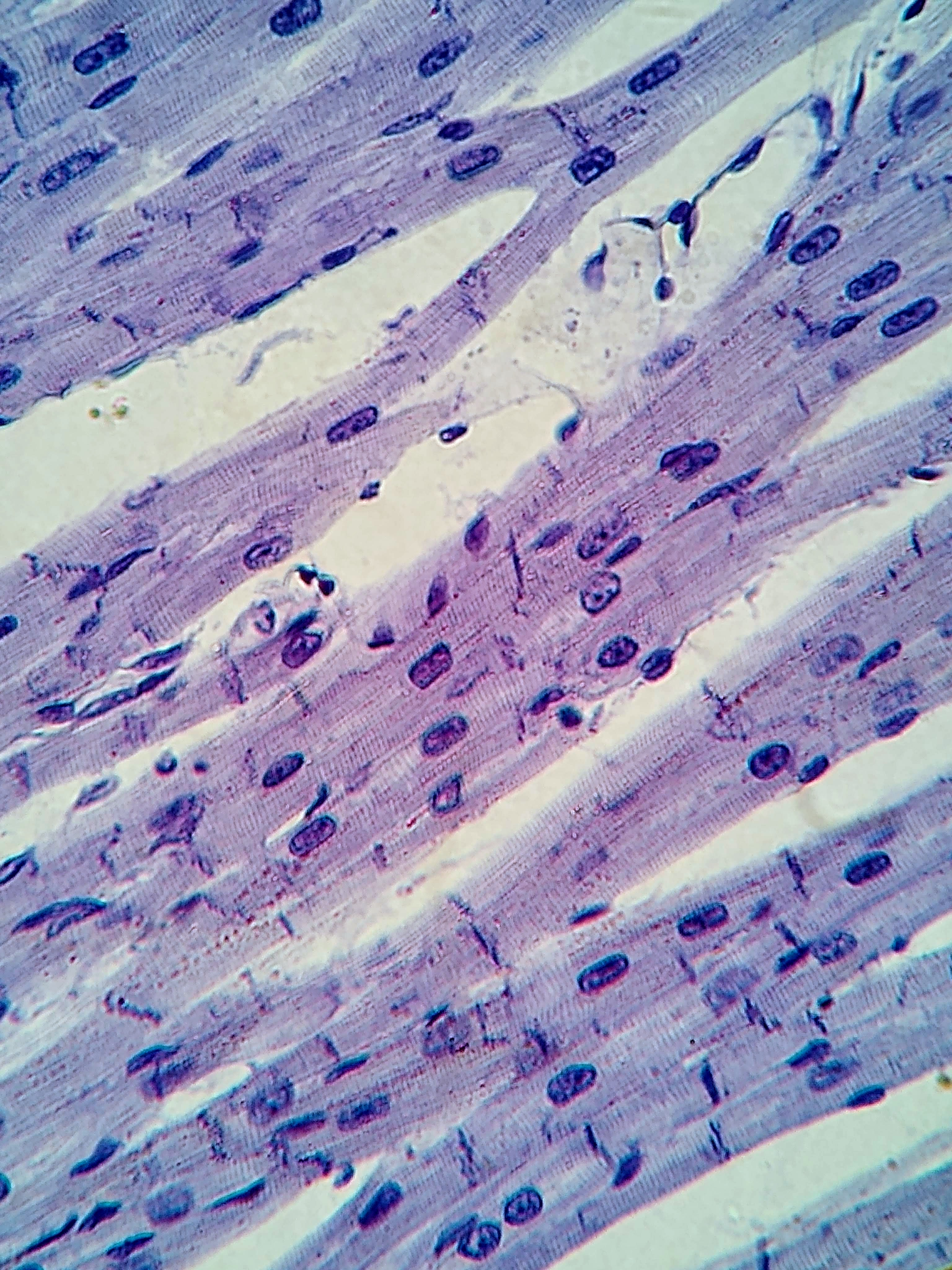
Cardiac muscle histology 400x

Myocytes are incredibly specialized cells with only a select number of different organelle types. A myocyte is composed of multiple myofibrils, which contain the “contractile units” of the muscle known as a sarcomere. These sarcomeres are arranged in adjacent formations along the myofibrils. Similarly to the plasma membrane of other cells, the sarcolemma protects and surrounds the myocytes. The two cellular components that perform the “sliding filament” contraction are myosin and actin, also referred to as the thick and thin filaments respectively The striations viewed using microscopy of the cardiac muscle are a result of the contrast between the thick and thin filaments. The z-line defines the borders of each sarcomere and act as the connection point between the thin filaments. The t-tubules and sarcoplasmic reticulum are used in conjunction to receive and direct the calcium ions and cause contraction. Once contracted, the clear H-zone between the actin filaments disappears as the filaments move towards each other.

Cardiomyocytes are a particular form of myocyte, only present in heart tissue. Along with the basic myocyte elements, these cells also contain one to four nuclei and a large amount of Adenosine Triphosphate (ATP). These additions aid in the heart's resistance to fatigue to consistently pump blood throughout the body to deliver oxygen. Most muscle cells contain a triad, which is a joining of 2 terminal cisternae of the sarcoplasmic reticulum and one t-tubule. However, cardiac muscle cells contain a diad, which is a linking of only one sarcoplasmic reticulum with its respective t-tubule. Another notable distinction between all muscle cells and cardiac muscle cells is the presence of intercalated discs. These tight connections between the cardiomyocytes allows for the accelerated sending of action potential signals to perform the rapid, rhythmic contraction of the heart muscle.

One of the most incredible attributes of cardiac muscle is the ability to automatically beat. This means that even when isolated, for example on a petri dish in an in- vitro setting, the tissue is able to contract and release. This is due to the presence of “pacemaker cells,” which originate from the sinoatrial node. This structure allows for spontaneous depolarization, sending signals throughout the tissue.

== Transverse-tubules ==
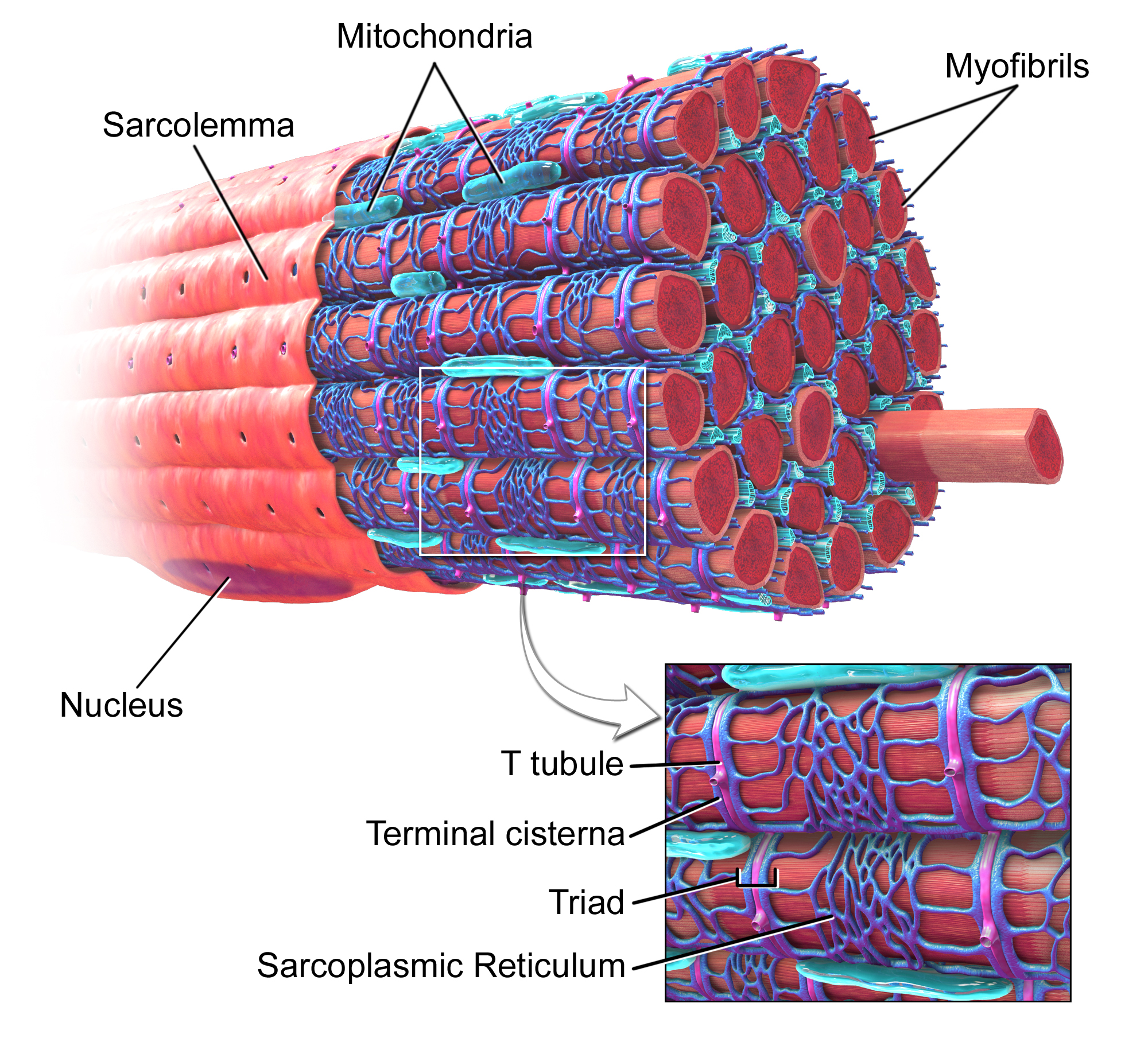
Muscle Anatomy

Within the sarcolemma of the myocyte, there are specific invaginations referred to as transverse-tubules. These structures attached to the sarcomere z-lines help to promote interaction between the extracellular space and the interior of the cell. Connecting these tubules to the Z line allows for a closer range of excitation- contraction coupling within the cell. Within the t-tubules, distinct ion channels and cellular proteins are present within the t-tubule bilayer that allow movement of calcium influx from the extracellular space into the myocyte to initiate depolarization and contraction. Once traveling through the t-tubules, the calcium arrives at the sarcoplasmic reticulum.

== Sarcoplasmic reticulum ==
Within the lumen of the cardiac myocyte, the sarcoplasmic reticulum serves as the area of controlling the amount of calcium influx into the interior of the cell. After traveling through the t-tubule, the calcium is stored in the sarcoplasmic reticulum to maintain low concentration of calcium inside the lumen. Upon contraction of this muscle, the cell is depolarized and the calcium is released into the lumen to create the excitation-contraction coupling. Once the initial calcium is released, a wave of additional calcium is discharged from the sarcoplasmic reticulum to maintain the contraction integrity.

The tension felt in muscles from prolonged contraction can be attributed to extended release of calcium ions through the sarcoplasmic reticulum. By absorbing calcium ions after contraction, the sarcoplasmic reticulum can regulate muscle fatigue and prevent overuse damage within the body.

== Voltage-gated calcium channels ==
Voltage-gated calcium channels play a critical role in controlling the influx of calcium ions into the myocyte in response to the changing action potential of the sarcoplasmic membrane. The increase in action potential of the cell indicates depolarization of the cell, directly opening the ion channels to cause muscular contraction. When the action potential decreases, the ion channels close, preventing any calcium influx and further muscular contraction. This fluctuation within the myocyte contributes to the rhythmic “pacemaking” of the cardiac tissue.

There are two classes of voltage- gated calcium channels, L- type and T- type. L-type calcium channels are more commonly found in myocardial tissue throughout the heart whereas T-type calcium channels are more concentrated in the pacemaker cells of the sinoatrial node. These channels also have slightly different activation levels. The L- type responds to a more positive action potential while the T- type channels are triggered at a more negative action potential. Discrepancies and/ or malfunctioning of these gates can contribute to a number of cardiac conditions, such as bradycardia.

== Cardiac conditions due to diad defects ==
Because the structural organization of the myocyte is very complex and specific, changes to their arrangement and/ or function can cause cardiac illnesses or defects. For example, a leading cause of heart failure can be attributed to the lack of t-tubule and sarcoplasmic reticulum junctions or a decreased distance between the structures. This change in structure causes the excitation- coupling response in the myocyte to either lessen significantly or be completely diminished. Therefore, few to no heart contractions would take place causing heart failure. On the contrary, an increase in the distance of the junction can create an increased excitation- coupling response, shown in both hypertension and cardiomyopathy. These conditions are proof that even the smallest changes in a complex structure can have long- range consequences.
