= Triad (anatomy) =

Structure of muscle tissue

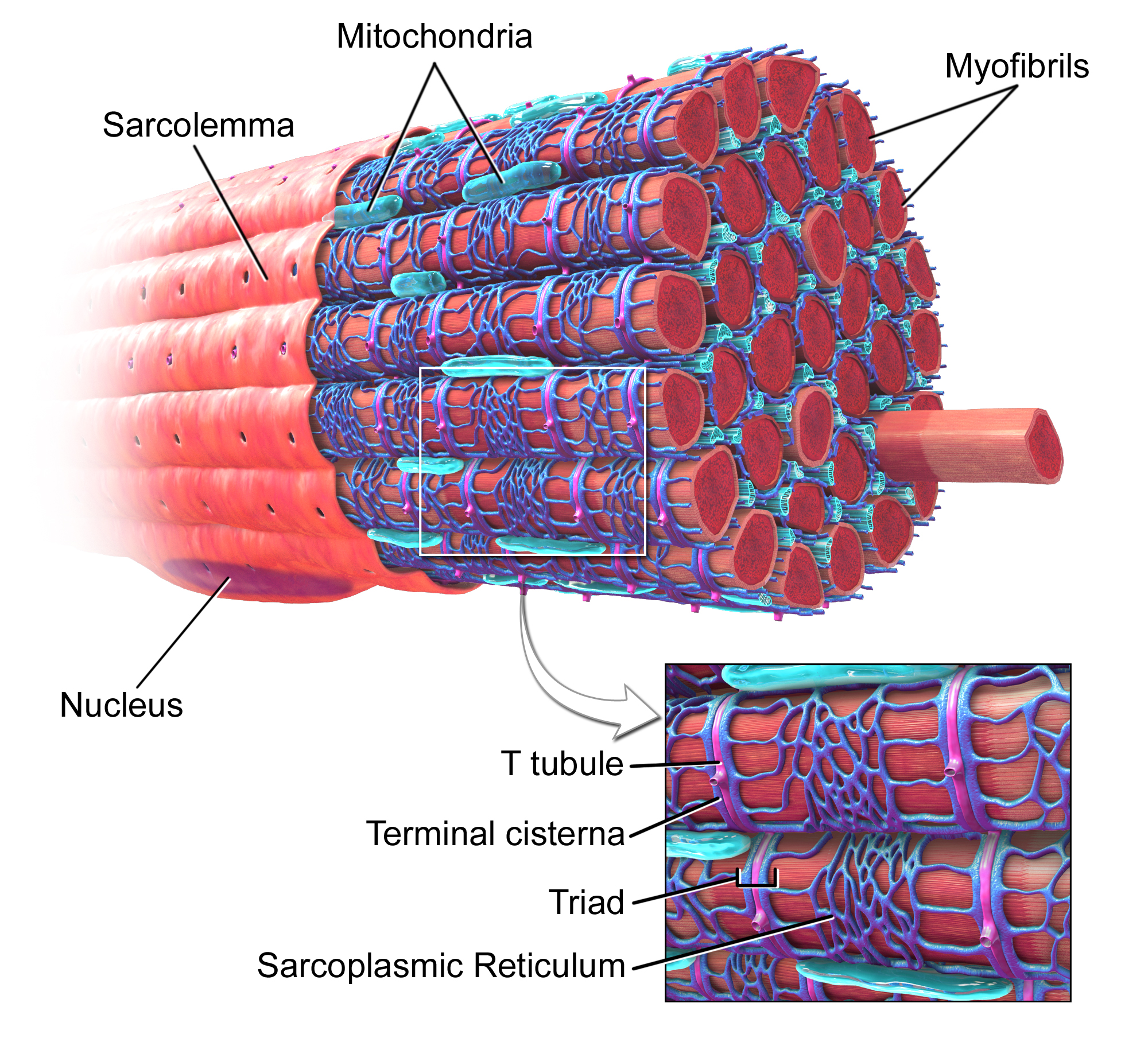
- Skeletal muscle, showing Triad as well as T-tubule.

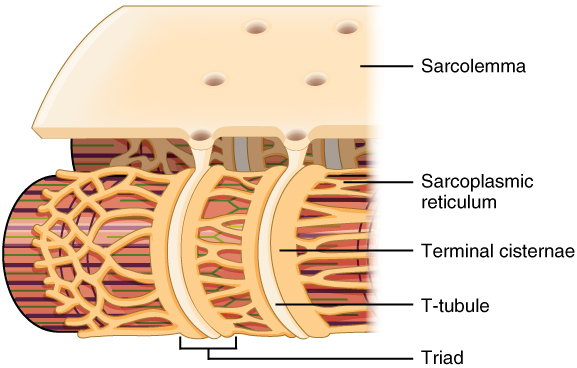
- Triad and T-tubule structure and relationship to the sarcoplasmic reticulum in skeletal muscle.

In the histology of skeletal muscle, a triad is the structure formed by a T tubule with a sarcoplasmic reticulum (SR) known as the terminal cisterna on either side. Each skeletal muscle fiber has many thousands of triads, visible in muscle fibers that have been sectioned longitudinally. (This property holds because T tubules run perpendicular to the longitudinal axis of the muscle fiber.) In mammals, triads are typically located at the A-I junction; that is, the junction between the A and I bands of the sarcomere, which is the smallest unit of a muscle fiber.

Triads form the anatomical basis of excitation-contraction coupling, whereby a stimulus excites the muscle and causes it to contract. A stimulus, in the form of positively charged current, is transmitted from the neuromuscular junction down the length of the T tubules, activating dihydropyridine receptors (DHPRs). Their activation causes 1) a negligible influx of calcium and 2) a mechanical interaction with calcium-conducting ryanodine receptors (RyRs) on the adjacent SR membrane. Activation of RyRs causes the release of calcium from the SR, which subsequently initiates a cascade of events leading to muscle contraction. These muscle contractions are caused by calcium's bonding to troponin and unmasking the binding sites covered by the troponin-tropomyosin complex on the actin myofilament and allowing the myosin cross-bridges to connect with the actin.

== See also ==
- Diad, a homologous structure in cardiac muscle
