= Atrial action potential =

Neuron communication in the heart atrium

In electrocardiography, the atrial action potential are action potentials that occur in the heart atrium. They are similar to ventricular action potential with the exception of having a more narrow phase 2 (plateau phase) due to a smaller calcium influx. Also, in comparison to the ventricular action potential, atrial action potentials have a more gradual repolarization period. This indicates that the atria's repolarization currents are not very large and they do not undergo a large repolarization peak.

== See also ==
Cardiac action potential
