= Dyadic space (cell biology) =

The dyadic space is the name for the volume of cytoplasm between pairs (dyads) of areas where the cell membrane and an organelle such as the endoplasmic reticulum (or sarcoplasmic reticulum) come into close contact (within 10-12 nanometers) of each other, creating what are known as dyadic clefts.

The space is important for ionic signalling. For example, the phenomenon of calcium-induced calcium release, when extracellular calcium enters the cell through ion channels in T-Tubules, leading to a rapidly increased calcium concentration in the dyadic space, triggering ryanodine receptors on the sarcoplasmic reticulum to release more calcium and trigger cardiac myocyte contraction - the heart beat.
