= NEURL2 =

Protein-coding gene in the species Homo sapiens

Identifiers
- Aliases: NEURL2, C20orf163, OZZ, OZZ-E3, neuralized E3 ubiquitin protein ligase 2
- External IDs: OMIM: 608597; MGI: 3043305; HomoloGene: 15435; GeneCards: NEURL2; OMA:NEURL2 - orthologs

Gene location (Human)
Chr.	Chromosome 20 (human)
Band	20q13.12	Start	45,888,625 bp
Band	20q13.12	End	45,891,208 bp

Gene location (Mouse)
Chr.	Chromosome 2 (mouse)
Band	2|2 H3	Start	164,672,652 bp
Band	2|2 H3	End	164,675,376 bp
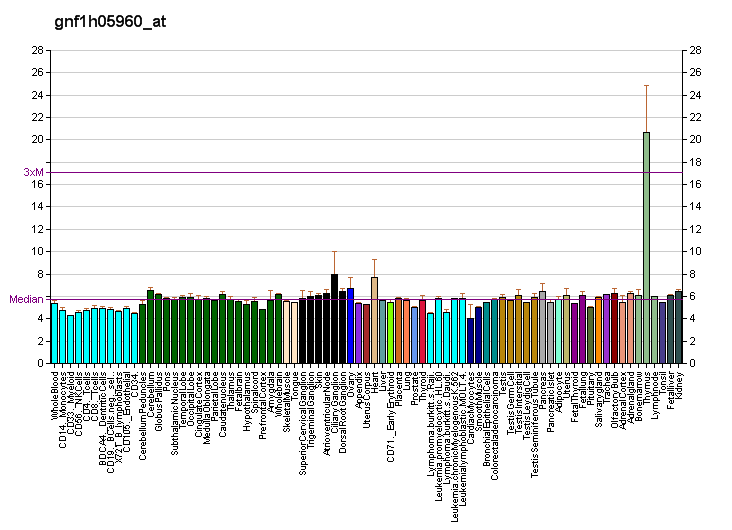
RNA expression pattern
Bgee	Human / Mouse (ortholog); Top expressed in: testicle; apex of heart; gastric mucosa; gonad; muscle of thigh; tendon of biceps brachii; thymus; gastrocnemius muscle; right adrenal cortex; quadriceps femoris muscle / Top expressed in: interventricular septum; vastus lateralis muscle; triceps brachii muscle; temporal muscle; myocardium of ventricle; ankle; muscle of thigh; sternocleidomastoid muscle; medial head of gastrocnemius muscle; digastric muscle; More reference expression data
BioGPS	More reference expression data
Gene ontology
Molecular function	ubiquitin protein ligase activity
Cellular component	cytoplasm; cytosol
Biological process	intracellular signal transduction; protein ubiquitination; post-translational protein modification
Sources:Amigo / QuickGO
Orthologs
Species	Human	Mouse
Entrez	140825	415115
Ensembl	ENSG00000124257	ENSMUSG00000039873
UniProt	Q9BR09	Q9D0S4
RefSeq (mRNA)	NM_080749; NM_001278535	NM_001082974
RefSeq (protein)	NP_001265464; NP_542787	NP_001076443
Location (UCSC)	Chr 20: 45.89 – 45.89 Mb	Chr 2: 164.67 – 164.68 Mb
PubMed search
- Wikidata
View/Edit Human	View/Edit Mouse

Neuralized-like protein 2 is a protein that in humans is encoded by the NEURL2 gene.

== Function ==
This gene encodes a protein that is involved in the regulation of myofibril organization. This protein is likely the adaptor component of the E3 ubiquitin ligase complex in striated muscle, and it regulates the ubiquitin-mediated degradation of beta-catenin during myogenesis.

== See also ==
- NEURL (gene)
