= Myofilament =

Protein filaments of myofibrils in muscle cells

- Myofilament

Details
- Part of: Myofibril

Identifiers
- Latin: myofilamentum
- TH: H2.00.05.0.00006
- FMA: 67897

Myofilaments are the three protein filaments of myofibrils in muscle cells. The main proteins involved are myosin, actin, and titin. Myosin and actin are the contractile proteins and titin is an elastic protein. The myofilaments act together in muscle contraction, and in order of size are a thick one of mostly myosin, a thin one of mostly actin, and a very thin one of mostly titin.

Types of muscle tissue are striated skeletal muscle and cardiac muscle, obliquely striated muscle (found in some invertebrates), and non-striated smooth muscle. Various arrangements of myofilaments create different muscles. Striated muscle has transverse bands of filaments. In obliquely striated muscle, the filaments are staggered. Smooth muscle has irregular arrangements of filaments.

== Structure ==
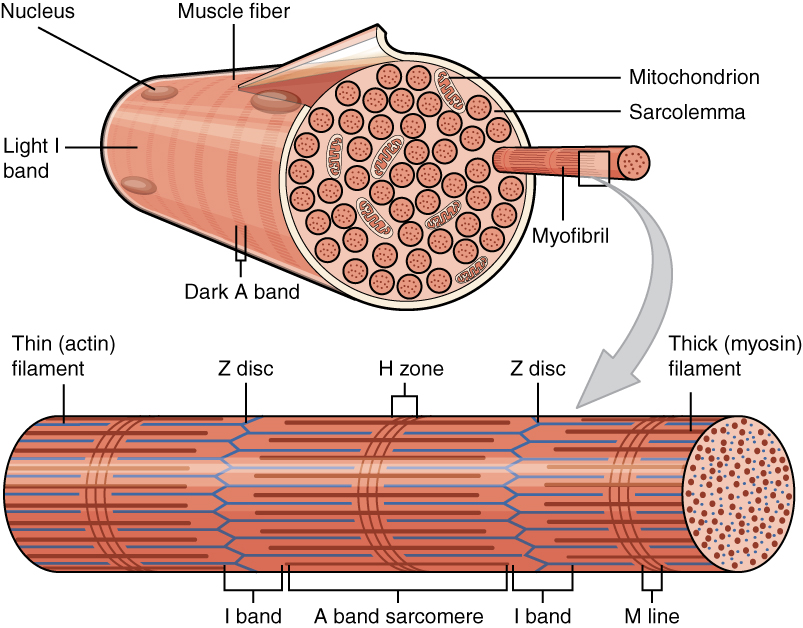
Muscle fiber showing thick and thin myofilaments of a myofibril.

There are three different types of myofilaments: thick, thin, and elastic filaments.

- Thick filaments consist primarily of a type of myosin, a motor protein – myosin II. Each thick filament is approximately 15 nm in diameter, and each is made of several hundred molecules of myosin. A myosin molecule is shaped like a golf club, with a tail formed of two intertwined chains and a double globular head projecting from it at an angle. Half of the myosin heads angle to the left and half of them angle to the right, creating an area in the middle of the filament known as the M-region or bare zone.
- Thin filaments, are 7 nm in diameter, and consist primarily of the protein actin, specifically filamentous F-actin. Each F-actin strand is composed of a string of subunits called globular G-actin. Each G-actin has an active site that can bind to the head of a myosin molecule. Each thin filament also has approximately 40 to 60 molecules of tropomyosin, the protein that blocks the active sites of the thin filaments when the muscle is relaxed. Each tropomyosin molecule has a smaller calcium-binding protein called troponin bound to it. All thin filaments are attached to the Z-line.
- Elastic filaments, 4 nm in diameter, are made of titin, a large springy protein. They run through the core of each thick filament and anchor it to the Z-line, the end point of a sarcomere. Titin also stabilizes the thick filament, while centering it between the thin filaments. It also aids in preventing overstretching of the thick filament, recoiling like a spring whenever a muscle is stretched.

== Function ==
The protein complex composed of actin and myosin, contractile proteins, is sometimes referred to as actomyosin. In striated skeletal and cardiac muscle, the actin and myosin filaments each have a specific and constant length in the order of a few micrometers, far less than the length of the elongated muscle cell (up to several centimeters in some skeletal muscle cells). The contractile nature of this protein complex is based on the structure of the thick and thin filaments. The thick filament, myosin, has a double-headed structure, with the heads positioned at opposite ends of the molecule. During muscle contraction, the heads of the myosin filaments attach to oppositely oriented thin filaments, actin, and pull them past one another. The action of myosin attachment and actin movement results in sarcomere shortening. Muscle contraction consists of the simultaneous shortening of multiple sarcomeres.

=== Muscle fiber contraction ===
The axon terminal of a motor neuron releases the neurotransmitter, acetylcholine, which diffuses across the synaptic cleft and binds to the muscle fiber membrane. This depolarizes the muscle fiber membrane, and the impulse travels to the muscle's sarcoplasmic reticulum via the transverse tubules. Calcium ions are then released from the sarcoplasmic reticulum into the sarcoplasm and subsequently bind to troponin. Troponin and the associated tropomyosin undergo a conformational change after calcium binding and expose the myosin binding sites on actin, the thin filament. The filaments of actin and myosin then form linkages. After binding, myosin pulls actin filaments toward each other, or inward. Thus muscle contraction occurs, and the sarcomere shortens as this process takes place.

=== Muscle fiber relaxation ===
The enzyme acetylcholinesterase breaks down acetylcholine and this ceases muscle fiber stimulation. Active transport moves calcium ions back into the sarcoplasmic reticulum of the muscle fiber. ATP causes the binding between actin and myosin filaments to break. Troponin and tropomyosin revert to their original conformation and thereby block binding sites on the actin filament. The muscle fiber relaxes and the entire sarcomere lengthens. The muscle fiber is now prepared for the next contraction.

=== Response to exercise ===
The changes that occur to the myofilament in response to exercise have long been a subject of interest to exercise physiologists and the athletes who depend on their research for the most advanced training techniques. Athletes across a spectrum of sporting events are particularly interested to know what type of training protocol will result in maximal force generation from a muscle or set of muscles, so much attention has been given to changes in the myofilament under bouts of chronic and acute forms of exercise.

While the exact mechanism of myofilament alteration in response to exercise is still being studied in mammals, some interesting clues have been revealed in Thoroughbred race horses. Researchers studied the presence of mRNA in skeletal muscle of horses at three distinct times; immediately before training, immediately after training, and four hours after training. They reported statistically significant differences in mRNA for genes specific to production of actin. This study provides evidence of the mechanisms for both immediate and delayed myofilament response to exercise at the molecular level.

More recently, myofilament protein changes have been studied in humans in response to resistance training. Again, researchers are not completely clear about the molecular mechanisms of change, and an alteration of fiber-type composition in the myofilament may not be the answer many athletes have long assumed. This study looked at the muscle specific tension in the quadriceps femoris and vastus lateralis of forty-two young men. Researchers report a 17% increase in specific muscle tension after a period of resistance training, despite a decrease in the presence of MyHC, myosin heavy-chain. This study concludes that there is no clear relationship between fiber-type composition and in vivo muscle tension, nor was there evidence of myofilament packing in the trained muscles.

== Research ==
Other promising areas of research that may illumine the exact molecular nature of exercise-induced protein remodeling in muscle may be the study of related proteins involved with cell architecture, such as desmin and dystrophin. These proteins are thought to provide the cellular scaffolding necessary for the actin-myosin complex to undergo contraction. Research on desmin revealed that its presence increased greatly in a test group exposed to resistance training, while there was no evidence of desmin increase with endurance training. According to this study, there was no detectable increase in dystrophin in resistance or endurance training. It may be that exercise-induced myofilament alterations involve more than the contractile proteins actin & myosin.

While the research on muscle fiber remodeling is on-going, there are generally accepted facts about the myofilament from the American College of Sports Medicine. It is thought that an increase in muscle strength is due to an increase in muscle fiber size, not an increase in number of muscle fibers and myofilaments. However, there is some evidence of animal satellite cells differentiating into new muscle fibers and not merely providing a support function to muscle cells.

The weakened contractile function of skeletal muscle is also linked to the state of the myofibrils. Recent studies suggest that these conditions are associated with altered single fiber performance due to decreased expression of myofilament proteins and/or changes in myosin-actin cross-bridge interactions. Furthermore, cellular and myofilament-level adaptations are related to diminished whole muscle and whole body performance.
