= Sodium-calcium exchanger =

Antiporter membrane protein that removes calcium from cells

solute carrier family 8 (sodium/calcium exchanger), member 1

Identifiers
- Symbol: SLC8A1
- Alt. symbols: NCX1
- NCBI gene: 6546
- HGNC: 11068
- OMIM: 182305
- RefSeq: NM_021097
- UniProt: P32418

Other data
- Locus: Chr. 2 p23-p21
Search for
- Structures: Swiss-model
- Domains: InterPro

solute carrier family 8 (sodium-calcium exchanger), member 2

Identifiers
- Symbol: SLC8A2
- NCBI gene: 6543
- HGNC: 11069
- OMIM: 601901
- RefSeq: NM_015063
- UniProt: Q9UPR5

Other data
- Locus: Chr. 19 q13.2
Search for
- Structures: Swiss-model
- Domains: InterPro

solute carrier family 8 (sodium-calcium exchanger), member 3

Identifiers
- Symbol: SLC8A3
- NCBI gene: 6547
- HGNC: 11070
- OMIM: 607991
- RefSeq: NM_033262
- UniProt: P57103

Other data
- Locus: Chr. 14 q24.1
Search for
- Structures: Swiss-model
- Domains: InterPro

The sodium-calcium exchanger (often denoted Na^{+}/Ca^{2+} exchanger, exchange protein, or NCX) is an antiporter membrane protein that removes calcium from cells. It uses the energy that is stored in the electrochemical gradient of sodium (Na^{+}) by allowing Na^{+} to flow down its gradient across the plasma membrane in exchange for the countertransport of calcium ions (Ca^{2+}). A single calcium ion is exported for the import of three sodium ions. The exchanger exists in many different cell types and animal species. The NCX is considered one of the most important cellular mechanisms for removing Ca^{2+}.

The exchanger is usually found in the plasma membranes and the mitochondria and endoplasmic reticulum of excitable cells.

== Function ==
The sodium–calcium exchanger is only one of the systems by which the cytoplasmic concentration of calcium ions in the cell is kept low. The exchanger does not bind very tightly to Ca^{2+} (has a low affinity), but it can transport the ions rapidly (has a high capacity), transporting up to five thousand Ca^{2+} ions per second. Therefore, it requires large concentrations of Ca^{2+} to be effective, but is useful for ridding the cell of large amounts of Ca^{2+} in a short time, as is needed in a neuron after an action potential. Thus, the exchanger also likely plays an important role in regaining the cell's normal calcium concentrations after an excitotoxic insult. Such a primary transporter of calcium ions is present in the plasma membrane of most animal cells. Another, more ubiquitous transmembrane pump that exports calcium from the cell is the plasma membrane Ca^{2+} ATPase (PMCA), which has a much higher affinity but a much lower capacity. Since the PMCA is capable of effectively binding to Ca^{2+} even when its concentrations are quite low, it is better suited to the task of maintaining the very low concentrations of calcium that are normally within a cell. The Na^{+}/Ca^{2+} exchanger complements the high affinity, low capacitance Ca^{2+}-ATPase and together, they are involved in a variety of cellular functions including:

- control of neurosecretion
- activity of photoreceptor cells
- cardiac muscle relaxation
- maintenance of Ca^{2+} concentration in the sarcoplasmic reticulum in cardiac cells
- maintenance of Ca^{2+} concentration in the endoplasmic reticulum of both excitable and nonexcitable cells
- excitation-contraction coupling
- maintenance of low Ca^{2+} concentration in the mitochondria

The exchanger is also implicated in the cardiac electrical conduction abnormality known as delayed afterdepolarization. It is thought that intracellular accumulation of Ca^{2+} causes the activation of the Na^{+}/Ca^{2+} exchanger. The result is a brief influx of a net positive charge (remember 3 Na^{+} in, 1 Ca^{2+} out), thereby causing cellular depolarization. This abnormal cellular depolarization can lead to a cardiac arrhythmia.

== Reversibility ==
Since the transport is electrogenic (alters the membrane potential), depolarization of the membrane can reverse the exchanger's direction if the cell is depolarized enough, as may occur in excitotoxicity. In addition, as with other transport proteins, the amount and direction of transport depends on transmembrane substrate gradients. This fact can be protective because increases in intracellular Ca^{2+} concentration that occur in excitotoxicity may activate the exchanger in the forward direction even in the presence of a lowered extracellular Na^{+} concentration. However, it also means that, when intracellular levels of Na^{+} rise beyond a critical point, the NCX begins importing Ca^{2+}. The NCX may operate in both forward and reverse directions simultaneously in different areas of the cell, depending on the combined effects of Na^{+} and Ca^{2+} gradients. This effect may prolong calcium transients following bursts of neuronal activity, thus influencing neuronal information processing.

=== Na^{+}/Ca^{2+} exchanger in the cardiac action potential ===
The ability for the Na^{+}/Ca^{2+} exchanger to reverse direction of flow manifests itself during the cardiac action potential. Due to the delicate role that Ca^{2+} plays in the contraction of heart muscles, the cellular concentration of Ca^{2+} is carefully controlled. During the resting potential, the Na^{+}/Ca^{2+} exchanger takes advantage of the large extracellular Na+ concentration gradient to help pump Ca^{2+} out of the cell. In fact, the Na^{+}/Ca^{2+} exchanger is in the Ca^{2+} efflux position most of the time. However, during the upstroke of the cardiac action potential there is a large influx of Na^{+} ions. This depolarizes the cell and shifts the membrane potential in the positive direction. What results is a large increase in intracellular [Na^{+}]. This causes the reversal of the Na^{+}/Ca^{2+} exchanger to pump Na^{+} ions out of the cell and Ca^{2+} ions into the cell. However, this reversal of the exchanger lasts only momentarily due to the internal rise in [Ca^{2+}] as a result of the influx of Ca^{2+} through the L-type calcium channel, and the exchanger returns to its forward direction of flow, pumping Ca^{2+} out of the cell.

While the exchanger normally works in the Ca^{2+} efflux position (with the exception of early in the action potential), certain conditions can abnormally switch the exchanger to the reverse (Ca^{2+} influx, Na^{+} efflux) position. Listed below are several cellular and pharmaceutical conditions in which this happens.

- The internal [Na^{+}] is higher than usual (like it is when digoxin and other cardiac glycoside medications block the Na^{+}/K^{+}-ATPase pump.)
- The sarcoplasmic reticulum release of Ca^{2+} is inhibited.
- Other Ca^{2+} influx channels are inhibited.
- If the action potential duration is prolonged.

== Structure ==
Based on secondary structure and hydrophobicity predictions, NCX was initially predicted to have 9 transmembrane helices. The family is believed to have arisen from a gene duplication event, due to apparent pseudo-symmetry within the primary sequence of the transmembrane domain. Inserted between the pseudo-symmetric halves is a cytoplasmic loop containing regulatory domains. These regulatory domains have C2 domain like structures and are responsible for calcium regulation. Recently, the structure of an archaeal NCX ortholog has been solved by X-ray crystallography. This clearly illustrates a dimeric transporter of 10 transmembrane helices, with a diamond shaped site for substrate binding. Based on the structure and structural symmetry, a model for alternating access with ion competition at the active site was proposed. The structures of three related proton-calcium exchangers (CAX) have been solved from yeast and bacteria. While structurally and functionally homologus, these structures illustrate novel oligomeric structures, substrate coupling, and regulation.

== History ==
In 1968, H Reuter and N Seitz published findings that, when Na^{+} is removed from the medium surrounding a cell, the efflux of Ca^{2+} is inhibited, and they proposed that there might be a mechanism for exchanging the two ions. In 1969, a group led by PF Baker that was experimenting using squid axons published a finding that proposed that there exists a means of Na^{+} exit from cells other than the sodium-potassium pump. Digitalis, more commonly known as foxglove, is known to have a large effect on the Na/K ATPase, ultimately causing a more forceful contraction of the heart. The plant contains compounds that inhibit the sodium potassium pump which lowers the sodium electrochemical gradient. This makes the pumping of calcium out of the cell less efficient, which leads to a more forceful contraction of the heart. For individuals with weak hearts, it is sometimes provided to pump the heart with heavier contractile force. However, it can also cause hypertension because it increases the contractile force of the heart.

== See also ==
- Sodium–potassium pump
- Active transport
- Cardiac action potential
- Potassium-dependent sodium-calcium exchanger
