= NEURL =

Protein-coding gene in the species Homo sapiens

NEURL1

Identifiers
- Aliases: NEURL1, NEUR1, NEURL, RNF67, bA416N2.1, neu, neu-1, neuralized E3 ubiquitin protein ligase 1
- External IDs: OMIM: 603804; MGI: 1334263; GeneCards: NEURL1
Enzyme activity
EC #	BRENDA	ExPASy	KEGG	MetaCyc
2.3.2.27	↗	↗	↗	↗

Gene location (Human)
Chr.	Chromosome 10 (human)
Band	10q24.33	Start	103,493,705 bp
Band	10q24.33	End	103,592,546 bp

Gene location (Mouse)
Chr.	Chromosome 19 (mouse)
Band	19 C3|19 39.39 cM	Start	47,167,259 bp
Band	19 C3|19 39.39 cM	End	47,247,880 bp
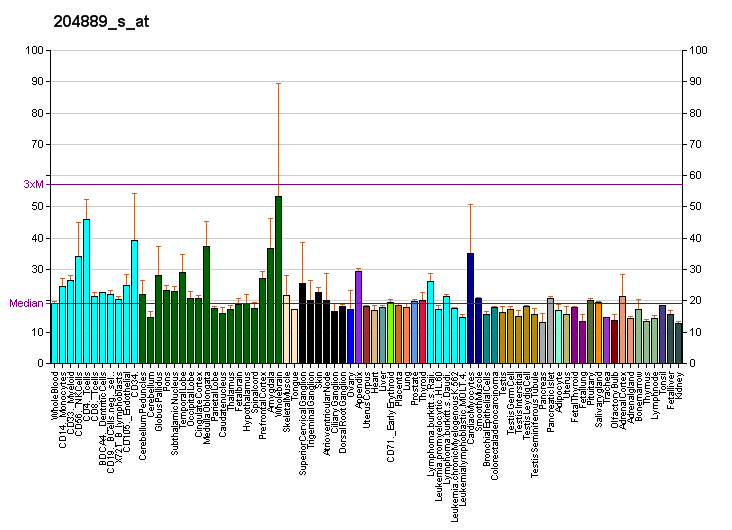

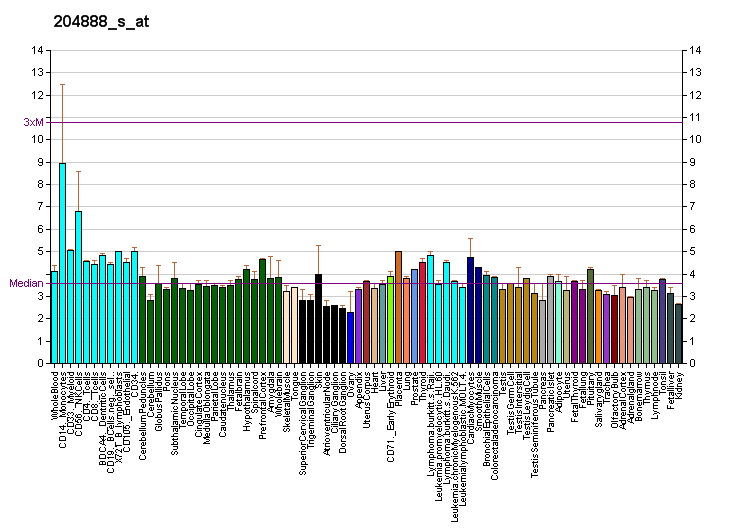
RNA expression pattern
Bgee	Human / Mouse (ortholog); Top expressed in: muscle of thigh; right hemisphere of cerebellum; gastrocnemius muscle; right frontal lobe; cingulate gyrus; anterior cingulate cortex; prefrontal cortex; nucleus accumbens; Brodmann area 9; amygdala / Top expressed in: muscle of thigh; superior frontal gyrus; triceps brachii muscle; primary visual cortex; temporal muscle; dentate gyrus of hippocampal formation granule cell; sternocleidomastoid muscle; skeletal muscle tissue; digastric muscle; vastus lateralis muscle; More reference expression data
BioGPS	More reference expression data
Gene ontology
Molecular function	translation factor activity, non-nucleic acid binding; ubiquitin protein ligase activity; metal ion binding; ubiquitin-protein transferase activity; transferase activity
Cellular component	cytoplasm; perikaryon; postsynaptic membrane; cell projection; membrane; postsynaptic density; plasma membrane; dendritic spine; synapse; cell junction; dendrite; perinuclear region of cytoplasm; apical dendrite
Biological process	Notch signaling pathway; flagellated sperm motility; positive regulation of epidermal growth factor-activated receptor activity; positive regulation of dendritic spine development; protein monoubiquitination; nervous system development; sperm axoneme assembly; positive regulation of synapse maturation; brain development; positive regulation of long-term neuronal synaptic plasticity; protein ubiquitination; positive regulation of apoptotic process; cellular response to amino acid stimulus; lactation; skeletal muscle tissue development; positive regulation of filopodium assembly; regulation of translation; negative regulation of cell population proliferation; negative regulation of Notch signaling pathway
Sources:Amigo / QuickGO
Orthologs
Databases	NCBI: entry; OMA: entry
Species	Human	Mouse
Entrez	9148	18011
Ensembl	ENSG00000107954	ENSMUSG00000006435
UniProt	O76050	Q923S6
RefSeq (mRNA)	NM_004210	NM_001163480; NM_021360
RefSeq (protein)	NP_004201	NP_001156952; NP_067335
Location (UCSC)	Chr 10: 103.49 – 103.59 Mb	Chr 19: 47.17 – 47.25 Mb
PubMed search
- Wikidata
View/Edit Human	View/Edit Mouse

Neuralized-like protein 1 is a protein that in humans is encoded by the NEURL1 gene (previously NEURL).

== See also ==
- NEURL2 (gene)
