= Ventricular action potential =

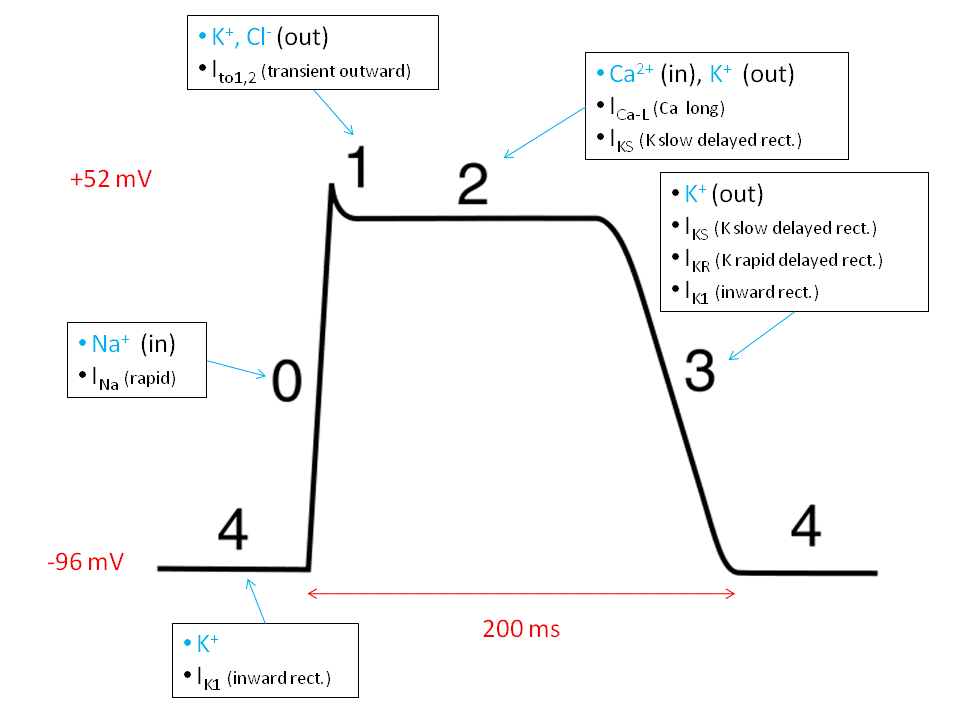
The action potential of a ventricular myocyte

In electrocardiography, the ventricular cardiomyocyte membrane potential is about −90 mV at rest, which is close to the potassium reversal potential. When an action potential is generated, the membrane potential rises above this level in five distinct phases.

1. Phase 4: Resting membrane potential remains stable at ≈−90 mV.
2. Phase 0: Rapid depolarisation, shifting the voltage to positive. Specialised membrane proteins (voltage-gated sodium channels) in the cell membrane selectively allow sodium ions to enter the cell. This causes the membrane potential to rise at a rate of about 300 V/s. As the membrane voltage rises (to about 40 mV) sodium channels close due to a process called inactivation.
3. Phase 1: Rapid repolarisation.
4. Phase 2: Plateau, the longest phase, approximately 100 ms.
5. Phase 3: Rapid repolarisation, which returns the membrane potential to resting potential.

The Na^{+} channel opening is followed by inactivation. Na^{+} inactivation comes with slowly activating Ca^{2+} channels at the same time as a few fast K^{+} channels open. There is a balance between the outward flow of K^{+} and the inward flow of Ca^{2+} causing a plateau of length in variables. The delayed opening of more Ca^{2+}-activated K^{+} channels, which are activated by build-up of Ca^{2+} in the sarcoplasm, while the Ca^{2+} channels close, ends the plateau. This leads to repolarization.

The depolarization of the membrane allows calcium channels to open as well. As sodium channels close calcium provides current to maintain the potential around 20 mV. The plateau lasts on the order of 100 ms. At the time that calcium channels are getting activated, channels that mediate the transient outward potassium current open as well. This outward potassium current causes a small dip in membrane potential shortly after depolarization. This current is observed in human and dog action potentials, but not in guinea pig action potentials.

Repolarization is accomplished by channels that open slowly and are mostly activated at the end of the action potential (slow delayed-rectifier channels) and channels that open quickly but are inactivated until the end of the action potential (rapid delayed rectifier channels). Fast delayed rectifier channels open quickly but are shut by inactivation at high membrane potentials. As the membrane voltage begins to drop the channels recover from inactivation and carry current.

== See also ==
- Cardiac action potential
