= Myofibril =

Contractile element of muscle

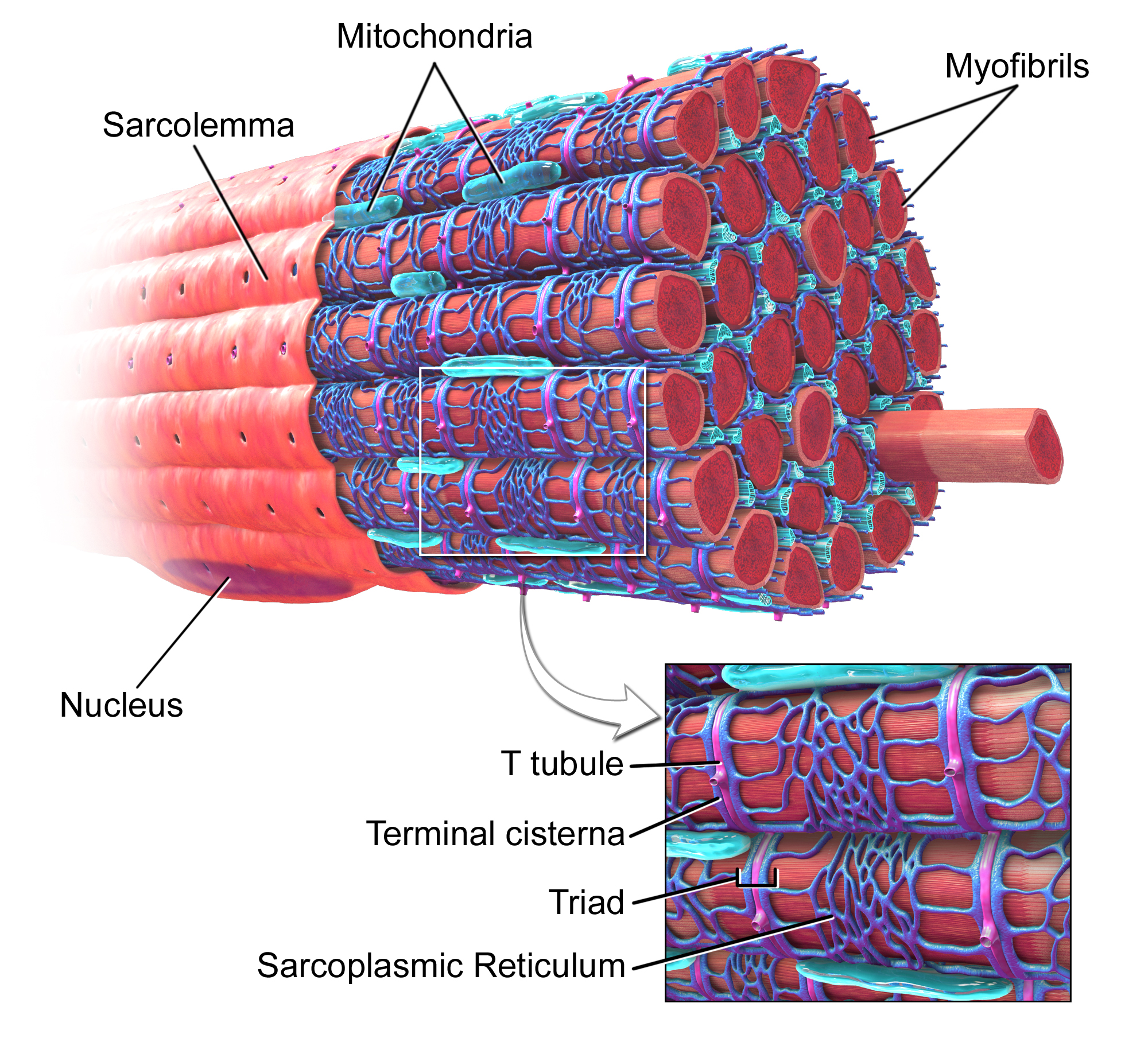
- Skeletal muscle, with myofibrils labeled at upper right.

Details

Identifiers
- Latin: myofibrilla
- MeSH: D009210
- TH: H2.00.05.0.00007

A myofibril (also known as a muscle fibril or sarcostyle) is a basic rod-like organelle of a muscle cell. Skeletal muscles are composed of long, tubular cells known as muscle fibers, and these cells contain many chains of myofibrils. Each myofibril has a diameter of 1–2 micrometres. They are created during embryonic development in a process known as myogenesis.

Myofibrils are composed of long proteins including actin, myosin, and titin, and other proteins that hold them together. These proteins are organized into thick, thin, and elastic myofilaments, which repeat along the length of the myofibril in sections or units of contraction called sarcomeres. Muscles contract by sliding the thick myosin, and thin actin myofilaments along each other.

== Structure ==
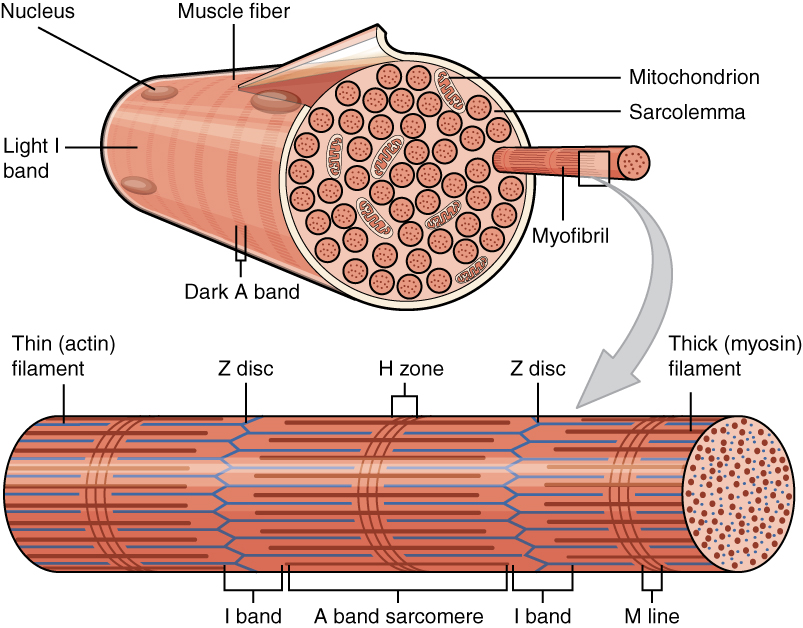
Muscle fibre organisation

Each myofibril has a diameter of between 1 and 2 micrometres (μm). The filaments of myofibrils, myofilaments, consist of three types, thick, thin, and elastic filaments.

- Thin filaments consist primarily of the protein actin, coiled with nebulin filaments. Actin, when polymerized into filaments, forms the "ladder" along which the myosin filaments "climb" to generate motion
- Thick filaments consist primarily of the protein myosin, that is responsible for force generation. It is composed of a globular head with both ATP and actin binding sites, and a long tail involved in its polymerization into myosin filaments.
- Elastic filaments are made up of a giant protein called titin and hold the thick filaments in place.

The protein complex composed of actin and myosin is sometimes referred to as actomyosin.

In striated skeletal and cardiac muscle tissue the actin and myosin filaments each have a specific and constant length on the order of a few micrometers, far less than the length of the elongated muscle cell (a few millimeters in the case of human skeletal muscle cells). The filaments are organized into repeated subunits along the length of the myofibril. These subunits are called sarcomeres that are around three μm in length. The muscle cell is nearly filled with myofibrils running parallel to each other on the long axis of the cell. The sarcomeric subunits of one myofibril are in nearly perfect alignment with those of the myofibrils next to it. This alignment gives the cell its striped or striated appearance. Exposed muscle cells at certain angles, such as in meat cuts, can show structural coloration or iridescence due to this periodic alignment of the fibrils and sarcomeres.

=== Appearance ===
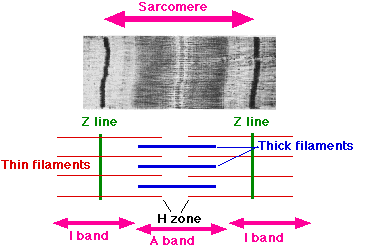

The names of the various sub-regions of the sarcomere are based on their relatively lighter or darker appearance when viewed through the light microscope. Each sarcomere is delimited by two very dark colored bands called Z-discs or Z-lines (from the German zwischen meaning between). These Z-discs are dense protein discs that do not easily allow the passage of light. The T-tubule is present in this area. The area between the Z-discs is further divided into two lighter colored bands at either end called the I-bands or Isotropic Bands, and a darker, grayish band in the middle called the A band or Anisotropic Bands.

The I bands appear lighter because these regions of the sarcomere mainly contain the thin actin filaments, whose smaller diameter allows the passage of light between them. The A band, on the other hand, contains mostly myosin filaments whose larger diameter restricts the passage of light. A stands for anisotropic and I for isotropic, referring to the optical properties of living muscle as demonstrated with polarized light microscopy.

The parts of the A band that abut the I bands are occupied by both actin and myosin filaments (where they interdigitate as described above). Also within the A band is a relatively brighter central region called the H-zone (from the German helle, meaning bright) in which there is no actin/myosin overlap when the muscle is in a relaxed state. Finally, the H-zone is bisected by a dark central line called the M-line (from the German mittel meaning middle).

== Development ==
A study of the developing leg muscle in a 12-day chick embryo using electron microscopy proposes a mechanism for the development of myofibrils. Developing muscle cells contain thick (myosin) filaments that are 160–170 Å in diameter and thin (actin) filaments that are 60–70 Å in diameter. Young myofibres contain a 7:1 ratio of thin to thick filaments. Along the long axis of the muscle cells in subsarcolemmal locations, free myofilaments become aligned and aggregate into hexagonally packed arrays. These aggregates form regardless of the presence of Z band or M band material. Aggregation occurs spontaneously because the tertiary structures of actin and myosin monomers contain all the "information" with the ionic strength and ATP concentration of the cell to aggregate into the filaments.

== Function ==
A diagram of the structure of a myofibril (consisting of many myofilaments in parallel, and sarcomeres in series)

Sliding filament model of muscle contraction

The myosin heads form cross bridges with the actin myofilaments; this is where they carry out a 'rowing' action along the actin. When the muscle fibre is relaxed (before contraction), the myosin head has ADP and phosphate bound to it.

When a nerve impulse arrives, Ca^{2+} ions cause troponin to change shape; this moves the troponin + tropomyosin complex away, leaving the myosin binding sites open.

The myosin head now binds to the actin myofilament. Energy in the head of the myosin myofilament moves the head, which slides the actin past; hence ADP is released.

ATP presents itself (as the presence of the calcium ions activates the myosin's ATPase), and the myosin heads disconnect from the actin to grab the ATP. The ATP is then broken down into ADP and phosphate. Energy is released and stored in the myosin head to utilize for later movement. The myosin heads now return to their upright relaxed position. If calcium is present, the process is repeated.

When a muscle contracts, the actin is pulled along myosin toward the center of the sarcomere until the actin and myosin filaments are completely overlapped. The H zone becomes smaller and smaller due to the increasing overlap of actin and myosin filaments, and the muscle shortens. Thus when the muscle is fully contracted, the H zone is no longer visible. Note that the actin and myosin filaments themselves do not change length, but instead slide past each other. This is known as the sliding filament theory of muscle contraction.

== See also ==
- Cross-bridge cycle
- Motor protein
