= T-tubule =

Extensions in cell membrane of muscle fibres

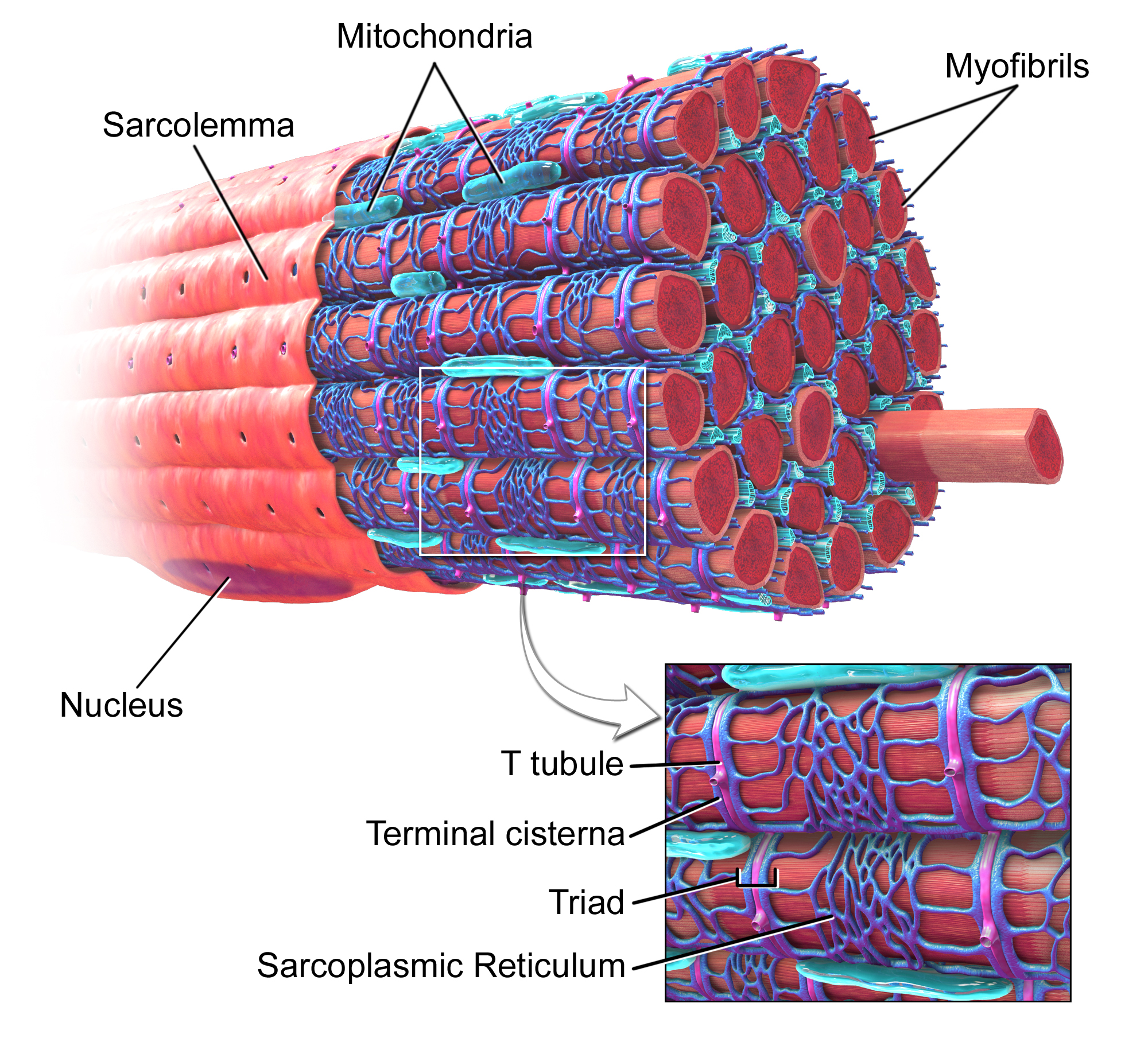
- Skeletal muscle fiber, with T-tubule labelled in zoomed in image.

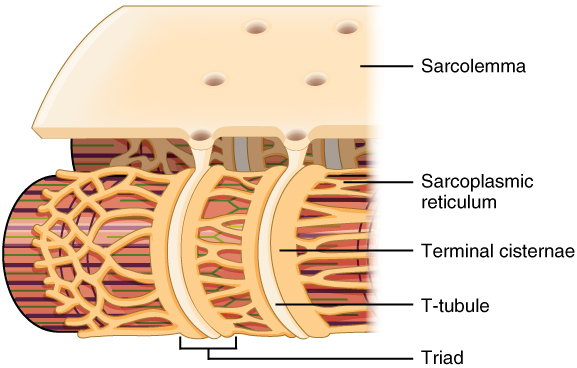
- T-tubule structure and relationship to the sarcoplasmic reticulum in skeletal muscle

Details
- Part of: Cell membrane of skeletal and cardiac muscle cells

Identifiers
- Latin: tubulus transversus
- TH: H2.00.05.2.01018, H2.00.05.2.02013

T-tubules (transverse tubules) are extensions of the cell membrane that penetrate into the center of skeletal and cardiac muscle cells. With membranes that contain large concentrations of ion channels, transporters, and pumps, T-tubules permit rapid transmission of the action potential into the cell, and also play an important role in regulating cellular calcium concentration.

Through these mechanisms, T-tubules allow heart muscle cells to contract more forcefully by synchronising calcium release from the sarcoplasmic reticulum throughout the cell. T-tubule structure and function are affected beat-by-beat by cardiomyocyte contraction, as well as by diseases, potentially contributing to heart failure and arrhythmias. Although these structures were first seen in 1897, research into T-tubule biology is ongoing.

== Structure ==
T-tubules are tubules formed from the same phospholipid bilayer as the surface membrane or sarcolemma of skeletal or cardiac muscle cells. They connect directly with the sarcolemma at one end before travelling deep within the cell, forming a network of tubules with sections running both perpendicular (transverse) to and parallel (axially) to the sarcolemma. Due to this complex orientation, some refer to T-tubules as the transverse-axial tubular system. The inside or lumen of the T-tubule is open at the cell surface, meaning that the T-tubule is filled with fluid containing the same constituents as the solution that surrounds the cell (the extracellular fluid). Rather than being just a passive connecting tube, the membrane that forms T-tubules is highly active, being studded with proteins including L-type calcium channels, sodium-calcium exchangers, calcium ATPases and Beta adrenoceptors.

While T-tubules only form postnatally in the cardiomyocytes of mice, rats, rabbits, and cats (e.g. around 4-9 days after birth in rats), they are already present during the fetal stage in species such as cows, guinea pigs, sheep, and humans. They are found in ventricular muscle cells in most species, and in both atrial and ventricular cardiac muscle cells (cardiomyocytes) from large mammals. In cardiac muscle cells, across different species, T-tubules are between 20 and 450 nanometers in diameter and are usually located in regions called Z-discs where the actin myofilaments anchor within the cell. T-tubules within the heart are closely associated with the intracellular calcium store known as the sarcoplasmic reticulum in specific regions referred to as terminal cisternae. The association of the T-tubule with a terminal cisterna is known as a diad.

In skeletal muscle cells, T-tubules are three to four times narrower than those in cardiac muscle cells, and are between 20 and 40 nm in diameter. They are typically located at either side of the myosin strip, at the junction of overlap (A-I junction) between the A and I bands. T-tubules in skeletal muscle are associated with two terminal cisternae, known as a triad.

=== Regulators ===
The shape of the T-tubule system is produced and maintained by a variety of proteins. The protein amphiphysin-2 is encoded by the gene BIN1 and is responsible for forming the structure of the T-tubule and ensuring that the appropriate proteins (in particular L-type calcium channels) are located within the T-tubule membrane. Junctophilin-2 is encoded by the gene JPH2 and helps to form a junction between the T-tubule membrane and the sarcoplasmic reticulum, vital for excitation-contraction coupling. Titin capping protein known as telethonin is encoded by the TCAP gene and helps with T-tubule development and is potentially responsible for the increasing number of T-tubules seen as muscles grow.

== Function ==
=== Excitation-contraction coupling ===
T-tubules are an important link in the chain from electrical excitation of a cell to its subsequent contraction (excitation-contraction coupling). When contraction of a muscle is needed, stimulation from a nerve or an adjacent muscle cell causes a characteristic flow of charged particles across the cell membrane known as an action potential. At rest, there are fewer positively charged particles on the inner side of the membrane compared to the outer side, and the membrane is described as being polarised. During an action potential, positively charged particles (predominantly sodium and calcium ions) flow across the membrane from the outside to the inside. This reverses the normal imbalance of charged particles and is referred to as depolarization. One region of membrane depolarizes adjacent regions, and the resulting wave of depolarization then spreads along the cell membrane. The polarization of the membrane is restored as potassium ions flow back across the membrane from the outside to the inside of the cell.

In cardiac muscle cells, as the action potential passes down the T-tubules it activates L-type calcium channels in the T-tubular membrane. Activation of the L-type calcium channel allows calcium to pass into the cell. T-tubules contain a higher concentration of L-type calcium channels than the rest of the sarcolemma and therefore the majority of the calcium that enters the cell occurs via T-tubules. This calcium binds to and activates a receptor, known as a ryanodine receptor, located on the cell's own internal calcium store, the sarcoplasmic reticulum. Activation of the ryanodine receptor causes calcium to be released from the sarcoplasmic reticulum, causing the muscle cell to contract. In skeletal muscle cells, however, the L-type calcium channel is directly attached to the ryanodine receptor on the sarcoplasmic reticulum allowing activation of the ryanodine receptor directly without the need for an influx of calcium.

The importance of T-tubules is not solely due to their concentration of L-type calcium channels, but lies also within their ability to synchronise calcium release within the cell. The rapid spread of the action potential along the T-tubule network activates all of the L-type calcium channels near-simultaneously. As T-tubules bring the sarcolemma very close to the sarcoplasmic reticulum at all regions throughout the cell, calcium can then be released from the sarcoplasmic reticulum across the whole cell at the same time. This synchronisation of calcium release allows muscle cells to contract more forcefully. In cells lacking T-tubules such as smooth muscle cells, diseased cardiomyocytes, or muscle cells in which T-tubules have been artificially removed, the calcium that enters at the sarcolemma has to diffuse gradually throughout the cell, activating the ryanodine receptors much more slowly as a wave of calcium leading to less forceful contraction.

As the T-tubules are the primary location for excitation-contraction coupling, the ion channels and proteins involved in this process are concentrated here – there are 3 times as many L-type calcium channels located within the T-tubule membrane compared to the rest of the sarcolemma. Furthermore, beta adrenoceptors are also highly concentrated in the T-tubular membrane, and their stimulation increases calcium release from the sarcoplasmic reticulum.

=== Calcium control ===
As the space within the lumen of the T-tubule is continuous with the space that surrounds the cell (the extracellular space), ion concentrations between the two are very similar. However, due to the importance of the ions within the T-tubules (particularly calcium in cardiac muscle), it is very important that these concentrations remain relatively constant. As the T-tubules are very thin, they essentially trap the ions. This is important as, regardless of the ion concentrations elsewhere in the cell, T-tubules still have enough calcium ions to permit muscle contraction. Therefore, even if the concentration of calcium outside the cell falls (hypocalcaemia), the concentration of calcium within the T-tubule remains relatively constant, allowing cardiac contraction to continue.

As well as T-tubules being a site for calcium entry into the cell, they are also a site for calcium removal. This is important as it means that calcium levels within the cell can be tightly controlled in a small area (i.e. between the T-tubule and sarcoplasmic reticulum, known as local control). Proteins such as the sodium-calcium exchanger and the sarcolemmal ATPase are located mainly in the T-tubule membrane. The sodium-calcium exchanger passively removes one calcium ion from the cell in exchange for three sodium ions. As a passive process it can therefore allow calcium to flow into or out of the cell depending on the combination of the relative concentrations of these ions and the voltage across the cell membrane (the electrochemical gradient). The calcium ATPase removes calcium from the cell actively, using energy derived from adenosine triphosphate (ATP).

=== Detubulation ===
In order to study T-tubule function, T-tubules can be artificially uncoupled from the surface membrane using a technique known as detubulation. Chemicals such as glycerol or formamide (for skeletal and cardiac muscle respectively) can be added to the extracellular solution that surrounds the cells. These agents increase the osmolarity of the extracellular solution, causing the cells to shrink. When these agents are withdrawn, the cells rapidly expand and return to their normal size. This shrinkage and re-expansion of the cell causes T-tubules to detach from the surface membrane. Alternatively, the osmolarity of the extracellular solution can be decreased, using for example hypotonic saline, causing a transient cell swelling. Returning the extracellular solution to a normal osmolarity allows the cells to return to their previous size, again leading to detubulation.

== History ==
The idea of a cellular structure that later became known as a T-tubule was first proposed in 1881. The very brief time lag between stimulating a striated muscle cell and its subsequent contraction was too short to have been caused by a signalling chemical travelling the distance between the sarcolemma and the sarcoplasmic reticulum. It was therefore suggested that pouches of membrane reaching into the cell might explain the very rapid onset of contraction that had been observed. It took until 1897 before the first T-tubules were seen, using light microscopy to study cardiac muscle injected with India ink. Imaging technology advanced, and with the advent of transmission electron microscopy the structure of T-tubules became more apparent leading to the description of the longitudinal component of the T-tubule network in 1971. In the 1990s and 2000s confocal microscopy enabled three-dimensional reconstruction of the T-tubule network and quantification of T-tubule size and distribution, and the important relationships between T-tubules and calcium release began to be unravelled with the discovery of calcium sparks. While early work focussed on ventricular cardiac muscle and skeletal muscle, in 2009 an extensive T-tubule network in atrial cardiac muscle cells was observed. Ongoing research focusses on the regulation of T-tubule structure and how T-tubules are affected by and contribute to cardiovascular diseases.

== Clinical significance ==
The structure of T-tubules can be altered by disease, which in the heart may contribute to weakness of the heart muscle or abnormal heart rhythms. The alterations seen in disease range from a complete loss of T-tubules to more subtle changes in their orientation or branching patterns. T-tubules may be lost or disrupted following a myocardial infarction, and are also disrupted in the ventricles of patients with heart failure, contributing to reduced force of contraction and potentially decreasing the chances of recovery. Heart failure can also cause the near-complete loss of T-tubules from atrial cardiomyocytes, reducing atrial contractility and potentially contributing to atrial fibrillation.

Structural changes in T-tubules can lead to the L-type calcium channels moving away from the ryanodine receptors. This can increase the time taken for calcium levels within the cell to rise leading to weaker contractions and arrhythmias. However, disordered T-tubule structure may not be permanent, as some suggest that T-tubule remodelling might be reversed through the use of interval training.

== See also ==
- Muscle contraction
