= Sarcolemma =

Cell membrane of a muscle fibre

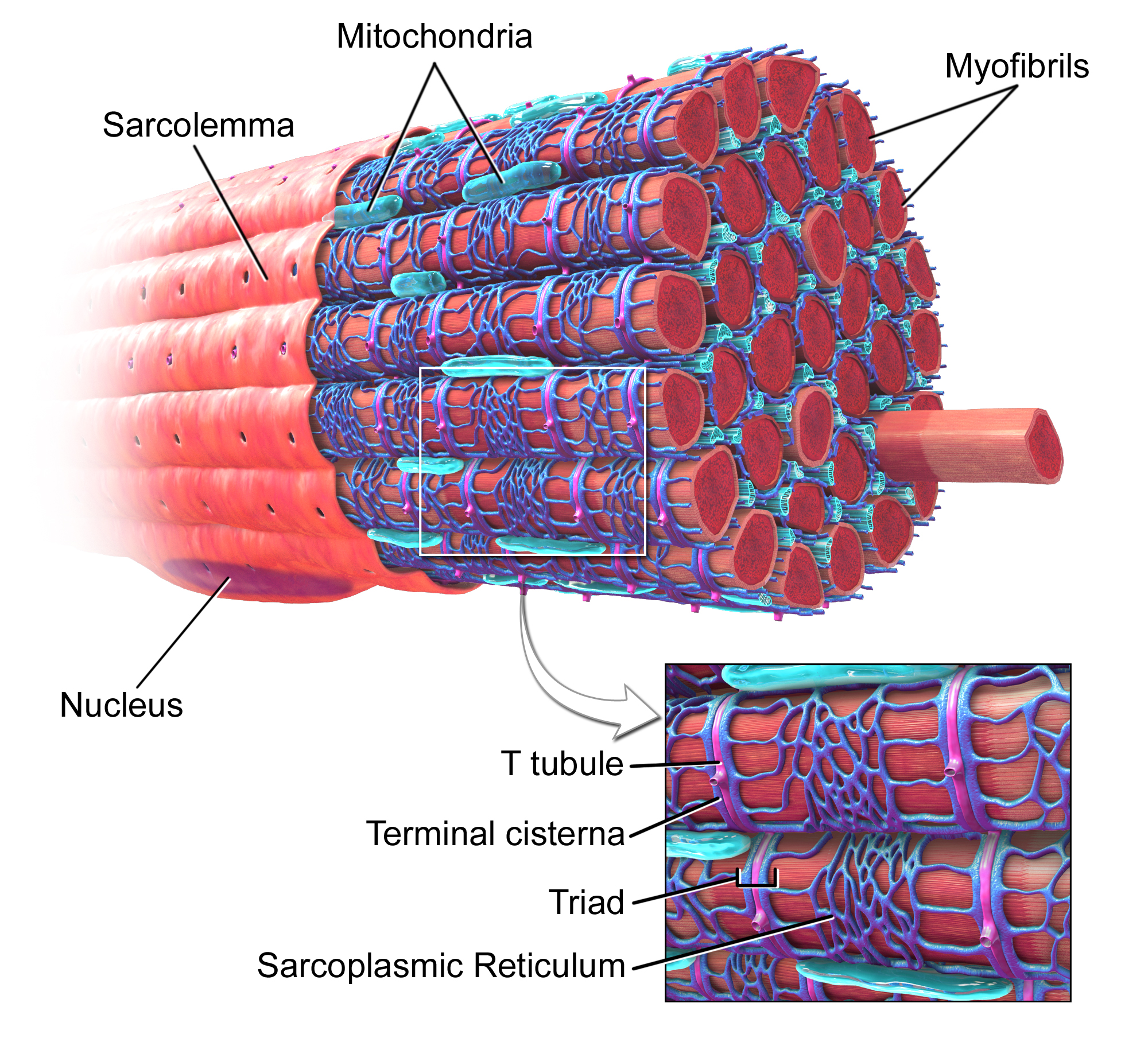
- Skeletal muscle fibre, with sarcolemma labeled at upper left.

Details
- Location: Striated muscle tissue
- Function: Cell membrane

Identifiers
- MeSH: D012508
- TH: H2.00.05.0.00003

The sarcolemma (sarco (from sarx) from Greek; flesh, and lemma from Greek; sheath), also called the myolemma, is the cell membrane surrounding a skeletal muscle fibre or a cardiomyocyte. It consists of a lipid bilayer and a thin outer coat of polysaccharide material (glycocalyx) that contacts the basement membrane. The basement membrane contains numerous thin collagen fibrils and specialized proteins such as laminin that provide a scaffold to which the muscle fibre can adhere. Through transmembrane proteins in the plasma membrane, the actin skeleton inside the cell is connected to the basement membrane and the cell's exterior. At each end of the muscle fibre, the surface layer of the sarcolemma fuses with a tendon fibre, and the tendon fibres, in turn, collect into bundles to form the muscle tendons that adhere to bones.

The sarcolemma generally maintains the same function in muscle cells as the plasma membrane does in other eukaryote cells. It acts as a barrier between the extracellular and intracellular compartments, defining the individual muscle fibre from its surroundings. The lipid nature of the membrane allows it to separate the fluids of the intra- and extracellular compartments, since it is only selectively permeable to water through aquaporin channels. As in other cells, this allows for the compositions of the compartments to be controlled by selective transport through the membrane. Membrane proteins, such as ion pumps, may create ion gradients with the consumption of ATP, that may later be used to drive transport of other substances through the membrane (co-transport) or generate electrical impulses such as action potentials.

A special feature of the sarcolemma is that it invaginates into the sarcoplasm of the muscle cell, forming membranous tubules radially and longitudinally within the fiber called T-tubules or transverse tubules. On either side of the transverse tubules are terminal cisternal enlargements of the sarcoplasmic reticulum (termed endoplasmic reticulum in nonmuscle cells). A transverse tubule surrounded by two SR cisternae are known as a triad, and the contact between these structures is located at the junction of the A and I bands.
