= Sarcoplasmic reticulum =

Calcium-storing organelle in muscle cells

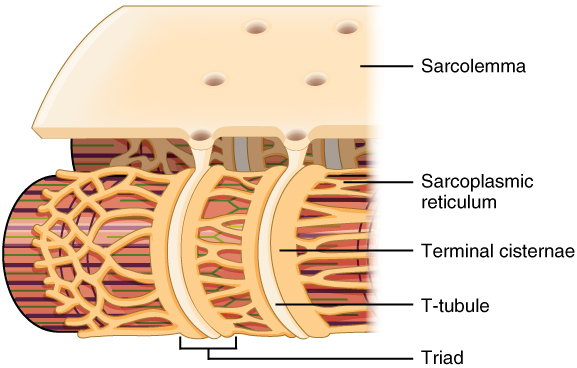
A cartoon section of skeletal muscle, showing T-tubules running deep into the centre of the cell between two terminal cisternae–junctional SR. The thinner projections, running horizontally between two terminal cisternae are the longitudinal sections of the SR.

The sarcoplasmic reticulum (SR) is a membrane-bound organelle found within muscle cells that is similar to the smooth endoplasmic reticulum in other cells. The main function of the SR is to store calcium ions (Ca^{2+}). Calcium ion levels are kept relatively constant, with the concentration of calcium ions within a cell being 10,000 times smaller than the concentration of calcium ions outside the cell. This means that small increases in calcium ions within the cell are easily detected and can bring about important cellular changes (the calcium is said to be a second messenger). Calcium is used to make calcium carbonate (found in chalk) and calcium phosphate, two compounds that the body uses to make teeth and bones. This means that too much calcium within the cells can lead to hardening (calcification) of certain intracellular structures, including the mitochondria, leading to cell death. Therefore, it is vital that calcium ion levels are tightly controlled and can be released into the cell when necessary, and then removed from the cell.

== Structure ==
Sarcomeres are the basic contractile unit composed of actin and myosin filaments.

The sarcoplasmic reticulum is a network of tubules that extend throughout muscle cells, wrapping around (but not in direct contact with) the myofibrils (contractile units of the cell). Cardiac and skeletal muscle cells contain structures called transverse tubules (T-tubules), which are extensions of the cell membrane that travel into the centre of the cell. T-tubules are closely associated with a specific region of the SR, known as the terminal cisternae in skeletal muscle, with a distance of roughly 12 nanometers, separating them. This is the primary site of calcium release. The longitudinal SR are thinner projections that run between the terminal cisternae/junctional SR, and are the location where ion channels necessary for calcium ion absorption are most abundant. These processes are explained in more detail below and are fundamental for the process of excitation-contraction coupling in skeletal, cardiac and smooth muscle.

== Calcium absorption ==
The SR contains ion channel pumps, within its membrane, that are responsible for pumping Ca^{2+} into the SR. As the calcium ion concentration within the SR is higher than in the rest of the cell, the calcium ions will not freely flow into the SR, and therefore pumps are required, which use energy, which they gain from a molecule called adenosine triphosphate (ATP). These calcium pumps are called Sarco(endo)plasmic reticulum Ca^{2+} ATPases (SERCA). There are various forms of SERCA, with SERCA 2a being predominantly found in cardiac and skeletal muscle.

SERCA consists of 13 structural elements (labelled M1-M10 α-helices in the transmembrane domain, and N, P, and A cytosolic domains). Calcium ions bind to the M1-M10 transmembrane region, whereas ATP binds to the N domain. When 2 calcium ions, along with a molecule of ATP, bind to the cytosolic side of the pump (i.e., the region of the pump outside the SR), the pump opens. This occurs because ATP (which contains three phosphate groups) releases a single phosphate group (becoming adenosine diphosphate). The released phosphate group then binds to the pump (in the P domain), causing the pump to change shape. This shape change causes the cytosolic side of the pump to open, allowing the two Ca^{2+} to enter. The cytosolic side of the pump then closes and the sarcoplasmic reticulum side opens, releasing the Ca^{2+} into the SR.

A protein found in cardiac muscle, called phospholamban (PLB), has been shown to prevent SERCA from working. It does this by binding to the SERCA and decreasing its attraction (affinity) to calcium, therefore preventing calcium uptake into the SR. Failure to remove Ca^{2+} from the cytosol prevents muscle relaxation and therefore means that there is a decrease in muscle contraction too. However, molecules such as adrenaline and noradrenaline, can prevent PLB from inhibiting SERCA. When these hormones bind to a receptor, called a beta 1 adrenoceptor, located on the cell membrane, they produce a series of reactions (known as a cyclic AMP pathway) that produces an enzyme called protein kinase A (PKA). PKA can add a phosphate to PLB (this is known as phosphorylation), preventing it from inhibiting SERCA and allowing for muscle relaxation.

== Calcium storage ==
Located within the SR is a protein called calsequestrin. This protein can bind to around 50 Ca^{2+}, which decreases the amount of free Ca^{2+} within the SR (as more is bound to calsequestrin). Therefore, more calcium can be stored (the calsequestrin is said to be a buffer). It is primarily located within the junctional SR/luminal space, in close association with the calcium release channel (described below).

== Calcium release ==
Calcium ion release from the SR occurs in the junctional SR/terminal cisternae through a ryanodine receptor (RyR) and is known as a calcium spark. There are three types of ryanodine receptor, RyR1 (in skeletal muscle), RyR2 (in cardiac muscle) and RyR3 (in the brain). Calcium release through ryanodine receptors in the SR is triggered differently in different muscles. In cardiac and smooth muscle, an electrical impulse (action potential) triggers calcium ions to enter the cell through an L-type calcium channel located in the cell membrane (smooth muscle) or T-tubule membrane (cardiac muscle). These calcium ions bind to and activate the RyR, producing a larger increase in intracellular calcium. In skeletal muscle, however, the L-type calcium channel is bound to the RyR. Therefore, activation of the L-type calcium channel, via an action potential, activates the RyR directly, causing calcium release (see calcium sparks for more details). Also, caffeine (found in coffee) can bind to and stimulate RyR. Caffeine makes the RyR more sensitive to either the action potential (skeletal muscle) or calcium (cardiac or smooth muscle), thereby producing calcium sparks more often (this is partially responsible for caffeine's effect on heart rate).

Triadin and Junctin are proteins found within the SR membrane that are bound to the RyR. The main role of these proteins is to anchor calsequestrin (see above) to the ryanodine receptor. At ‘normal’ (physiological) SR calcium levels, calsequestrin binds to the RyR, Triadin, and Junctin, which prevents the RyR from opening. If calcium concentration within the SR falls too low, there will be less calcium bound to the calsequestrin. This means that there is more room on the calsequestrin to bind to the junctin, triadin, and ryanodine receptor; therefore, it binds tighter. However, if calcium within the SR rises too high, more calcium binds to the calsequestrin, and therefore it binds to the junctin-triadin-RyR complex less tightly. The RyR can therefore open and release calcium into the cell.

In addition to the effects that PKA had on phospholamban (see above) that resulted in increased relaxation of the cardiac muscle, PKA (as well as another enzyme called calmodulin kinase II) can also phosphorylate ryanodine receptors. When phosphorylated, RyRs are more sensitive to calcium; therefore, they open more often and for longer periods. This increases calcium release from the SR, increasing the rate of contraction. Therefore, in cardiac muscle, activation of PKA, through the cyclic AMP pathway, results in increased muscle contraction (via RyR2 phosphorylation) and increased relaxation (via phospholamban phosphorylation), which increases heart rate.

The mechanism behind the termination of calcium release through the RyR is still not fully understood. Some researchers believe it is due to the random closing of ryanodine receptors (known as stochastic attrition), or the ryanodine receptors becoming inactive after a calcium spark, while others believe that a decrease in SR calcium, triggers the receptors to close (see calcium sparks for more details).

== Role in rigor mortis ==
The breakdown of the sarcoplasmic reticulum, along with the resultant release of calcium, is an important contributor to rigor mortis, the stiffening of muscles after death.

An increase in calcium concentration in the sarcoplasm can also cause muscle stiffness.
