= Regional function of the heart =

The assessment of the regional function of the heart is a good tool for early detection of deterioration in certain parts of the heart wall before a cardiac arrest is diagnosed. One of the most accurate measures of changes in regional function is the use of strain as a measure of the regional function of cardiac muscle.

== Cardiac function and regional function ==
One of the most important indicators of heart problems is described as the weakening of cardiac function. This means that the heart's ability to circulate blood throughout the body is diminished. Before this becomes a problem for other organs of the body, it is beneficial to detect early progress of the disease in the heart wall muscle itself. This can be detected, when the proper device is used, as weakening of the contractility of a part of the heart muscle. Hence, it is described as a change in regional function. The weakening of regional function does not always lead to a weakening in overall cardiac function. This will depend on a number of factors, including the degree of regional weakening and its extent inside the wall.

== Regional function and the heart muscle (myocardium) ==
The myocytes of the heart (also called the myocardial fibers) are arranged in a general circumferential direction in the ventricles. In the left ventricle (LV), the fiber will change gradually in direction from a certain longitudinal-circumferential direction in the outer layer of the heart (epicardium) to another angulated direction almost orthogonal in the inner wall (endocardium), becoming overwhelmingly circumferential somewhere halfway in the middle of the wall. It is, therefore, perceived that measuring the strain in the circumferential direction is a good indicator of the contractility of the fibers.

== Using strain to measure regional function ==
There are different ways to measure the regional function of the wall. It has been proposed to measure the speed of the LV wall motion, the thickening of the wall, or other changes in the shape of small regions of the wall as it contracts and relaxes. The latter is best measured using the mechanical quantity called “strain." Strain can be described as the percentile change in spacing between two points on a deforming object.

=== Principal strain components of the heart ===
Because strain is measured between two points, that strain, therefore, describes the change in distance along the direction connecting the two points. If we think of a rubber band that is stretched, the strain along the band will have a positive value for stretching, i.e., when selecting two points placed along the band length. At the same time, the bandwidth will decrease, resulting in a negative strain orthogonal to the band's length. In the case of the heart, it has become conventional to use certain directions for measuring strain:

==== Radial strain (Err) ====
This is the strain measured along the thickness of the wall. In fact, it measures the wall thickening. In a normal heart, the radial strain is positive as measured from end-diastole.

==== Longitudinal strain (Ell) ====
For the LV and RV, it is the strain that measured the shortening (or relaxation) of the wall muscle from the base of the ventricles to the apex. In a normal heart, the longitudinal strain is negative as measured from end diastole.

==== Circumferential strain (Ecc) ====
This is the third strain component whose direction is orthogonal to both the radial and longitudinal. One way to see it is the reduction of the circumference of the LV chamber as seen in a short-axis view. The annular shape of the LV wall will change and become thicker (radial strain) with a smaller inner circle (circumferential strain). In a normal heart, the circumferential strain or positives negative as measured from end-diastole.

Note that:

- Strain has a sign: A contraction of a muscle fiber yields a negative strain measurement along the fiber axis.
- Strain is relative: Strain is the normalized change in distance between two points, but the question is, change is relative to what? If a rubber band is continuously stretched and left to relax, then the strain between two points along the length of the rubber band will depend on which part of the cycle is observed. If then we measure the spacing between the two points from a specific time instant (A) to a new one (B) while the band was being stretched, a positive strain will be measured and the value will depend on the time separation between A and B. Vice versa, if the two instants are picked as the band is relaxing, a negative value strain will be measured. Although there might be an infinite number of references, we can identify two important time references.

Peak contraction: This is the point of time when the rubber band is smallest. In the case of the LV of the heart, it can be identified as end-systole. However, end-systole describes a global change in the chamber, which is the sum of the contraction of the regions. Because of the different timing of activation of the wall region and other factors, the end-systole does not coincide exactly with the peak contractions of the regions. In a normal heart, these times should be close enough for efficient pumping by the heart, but they are not exactly the same. When the variance in time exceeds a certain degree, the heart becomes more dyssynchronous.

Peak stretching: Similar to peak contraction, peak stretching is the instant when the rubber band is at its maximum length. In the case of the LV, it will correspond with end-diastole, and with the same comment about the variance in end-systole.

== Measuring strain of the heart ==
Determining viability from peak Ecc values.

Strain can be measured by various medical imaging modalities. Of special interest is using echocardiography or magnetic resonance imaging (MRI). In echocardiography, strain can be measured by using Tissue Doppler Imaging (TDI) or Speckle Tracking Echocardiography (STE). Using MRI, strain and deformation can be measured, noninvasively, using MRI Tagging and Harmonic Phase Analysis (HARP), Strain Encoding (SENC), or Tissue Tracking. The latter is similar to STE, although the MRI images do not show significant heterogeneity within the tissue to track.

One of the applications is using peak circumferential strain to the viability of the myocardium. The figure shows this relation, as well as converting the strain value into the typical qualitative assessment as normal, hypokinetic, akinetic, and dyskinetic for the wall motion.
