= Cardiac muscle =

Muscular tissue of heart in vertebrates

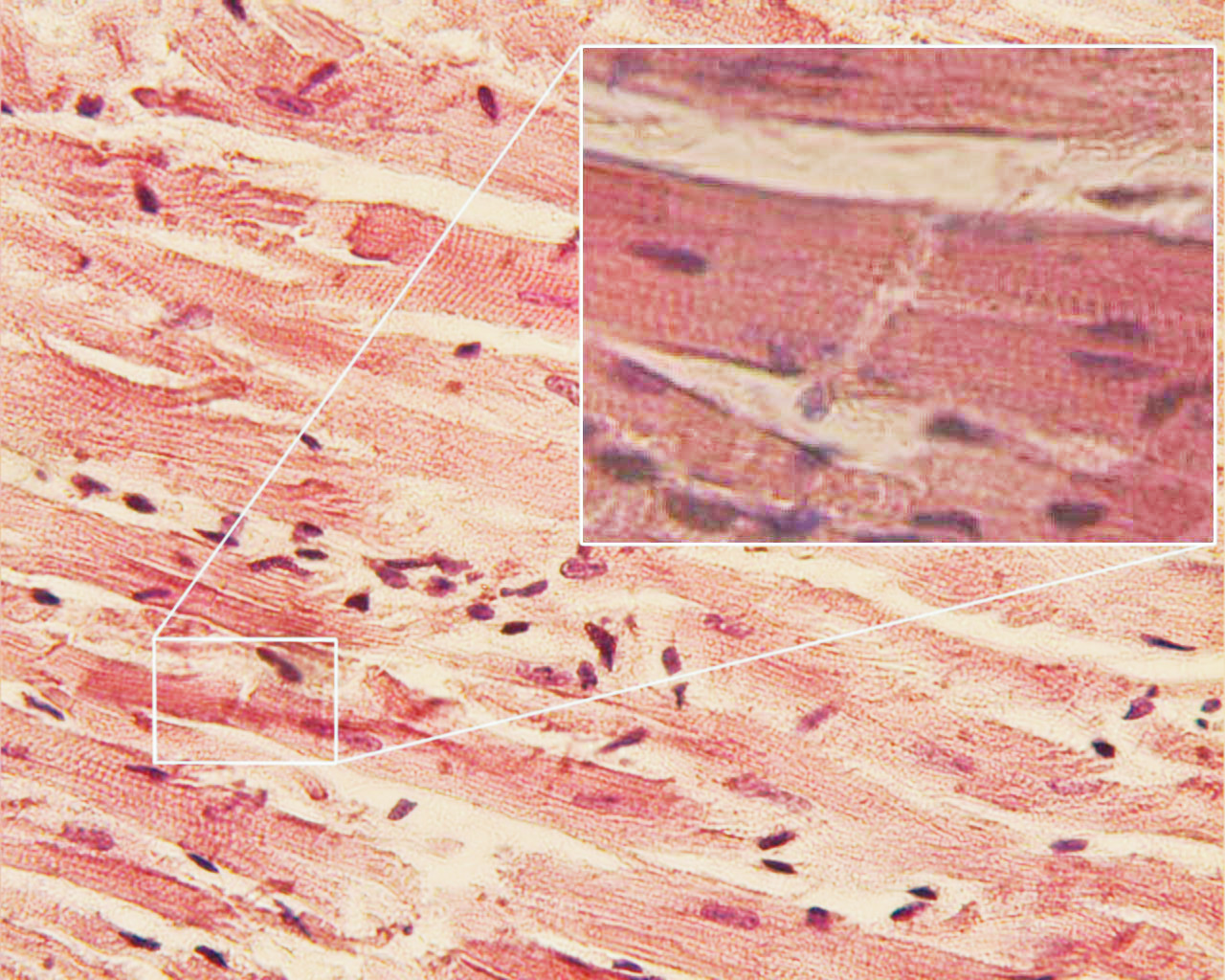

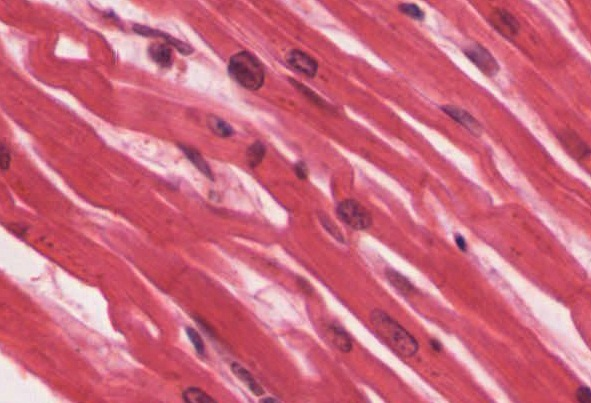

Details
- Part of: The heart wall

Identifiers
- Latin: textus muscularis striatus cardiacus
- MeSH: D009206
- TA98: A12.1.06.001
- TA2: 3950
- FMA: 9462

Cardiac muscle (also called heart muscle or myocardium) is one of three types of vertebrate muscle tissues, the others being skeletal muscle and smooth muscle. It is an involuntary, striated muscle that constitutes the main tissue of the wall of the heart. The cardiac muscle (myocardium) forms a thick middle layer between the outer layer of the heart wall (the pericardium) and the inner layer (the endocardium), with blood supplied via the coronary circulation. It is composed of individual cardiac muscle cells joined by intercalated discs, and encased by collagen fibers and other substances that form the extracellular matrix.

Cardiac muscle contracts in a similar manner to skeletal muscle, although with some important differences. Electrical stimulation in the form of a cardiac action potential triggers the release of calcium from the cell's internal calcium store, the sarcoplasmic reticulum. The rise in calcium causes the cell's myofilaments to slide past each other in a process called excitation-contraction coupling. Diseases of the heart muscle known as cardiomyopathies are of major importance. These include ischemic conditions caused by a restricted blood supply to the muscle such as angina, and myocardial infarction.

== Structure ==
=== Gross anatomy ===
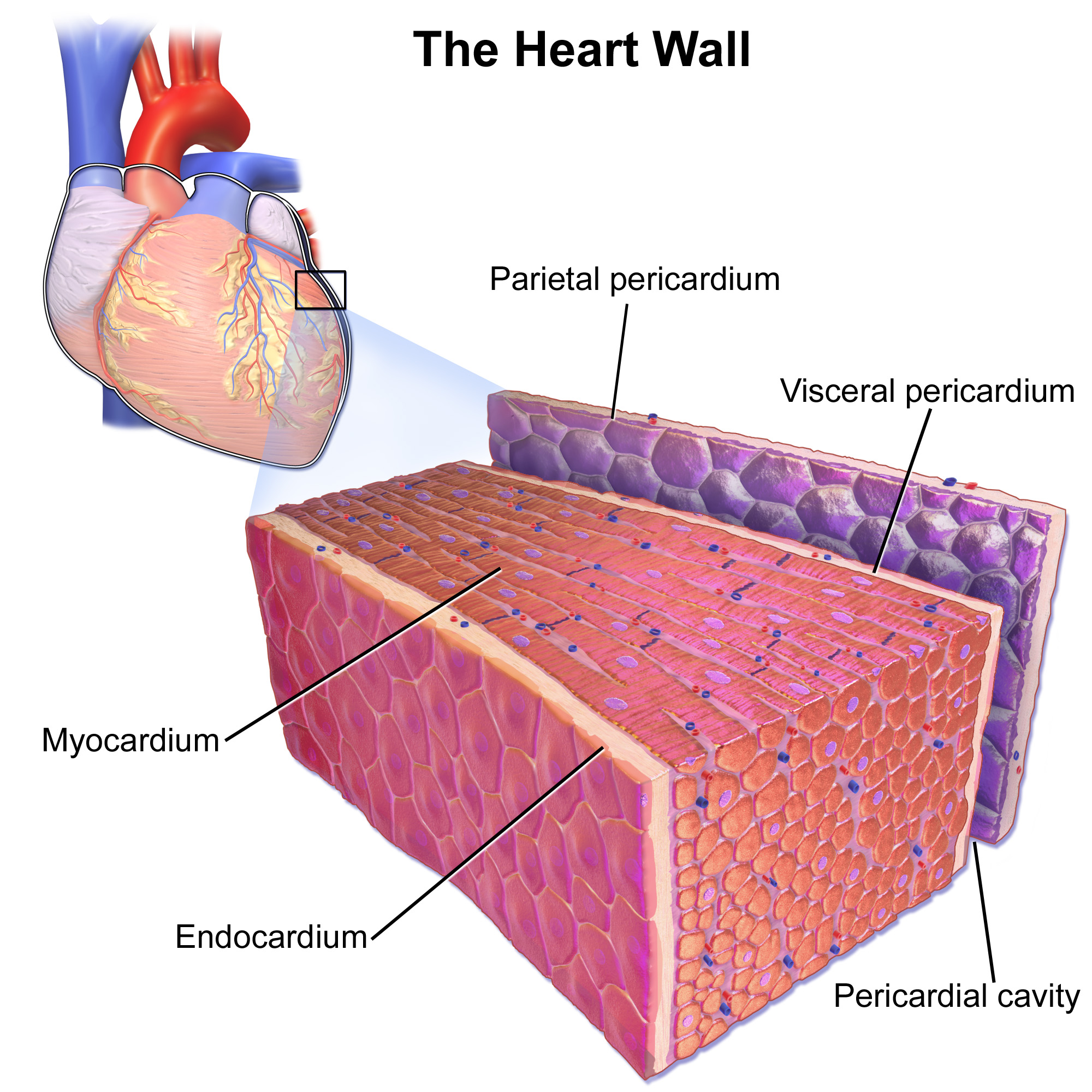
3D rendering showing thick myocardium within the heart wall.

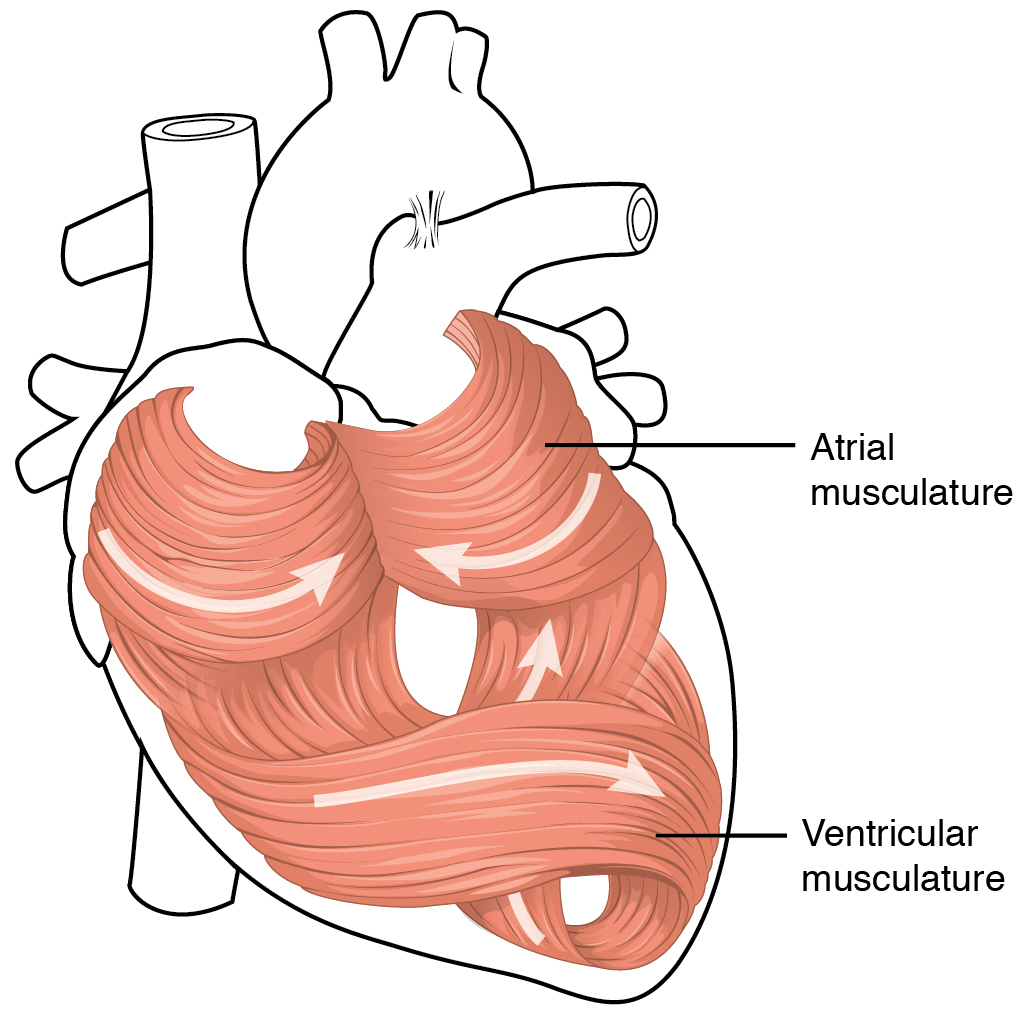
Differently oriented cardiac muscle fibers.

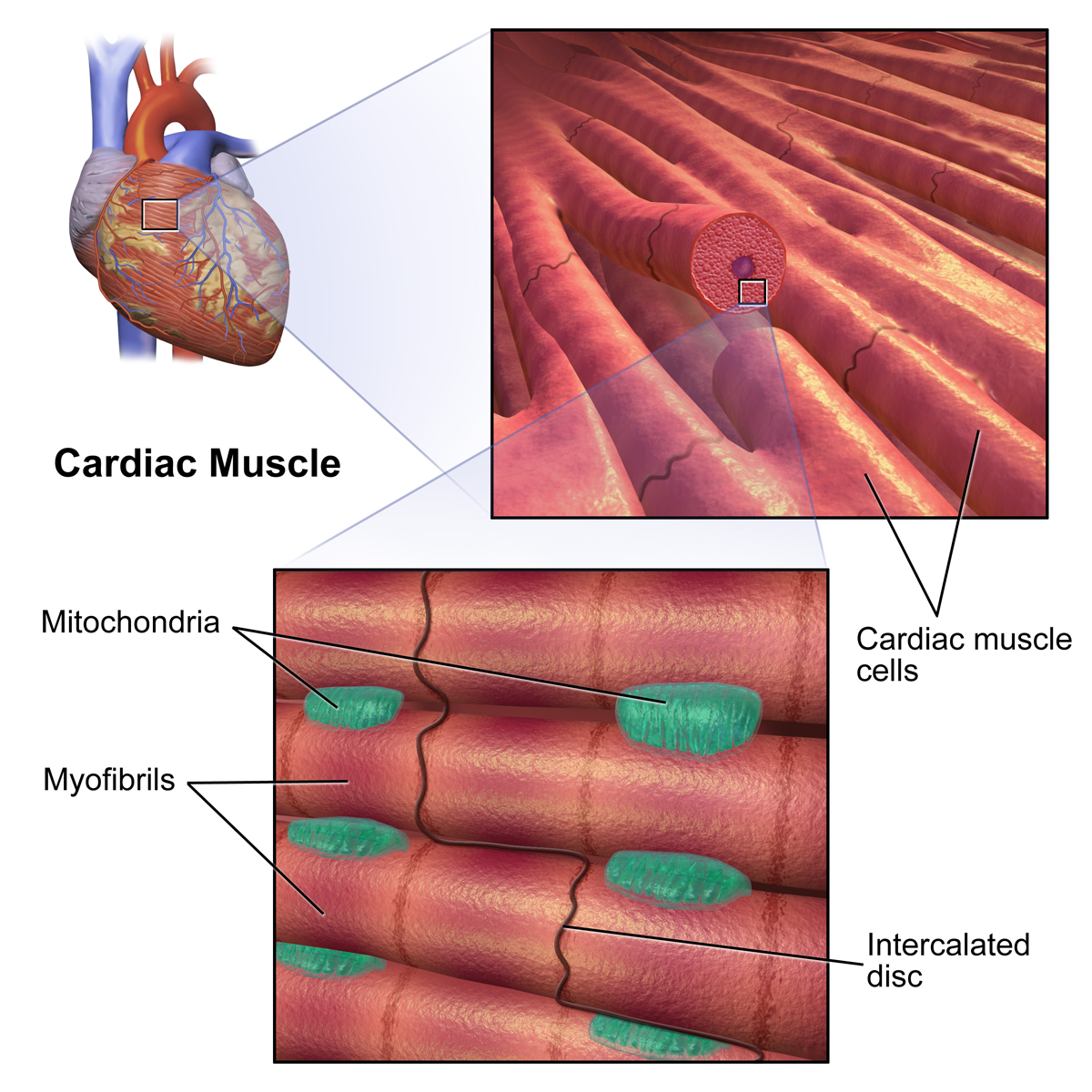
Cardiac muscle

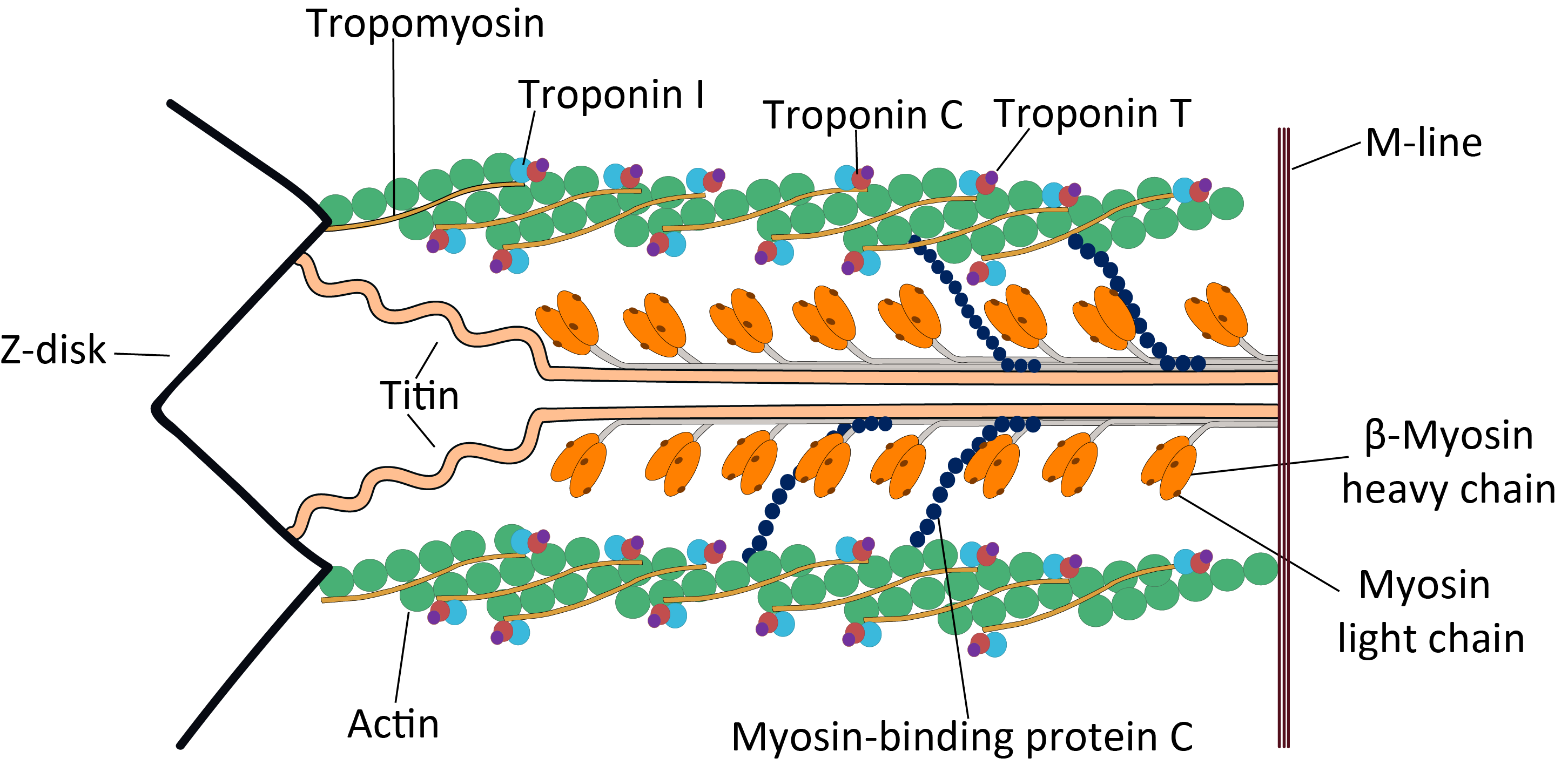
Cardiac sarcomere structure

Cardiac muscle tissue or myocardium forms the bulk of the heart. The heart wall is a three-layered structure with a thick layer of myocardium sandwiched between the inner endocardium and the outer epicardium (also known as the visceral pericardium). The inner endocardium lines the cardiac chambers, covers the cardiac valves, and joins with the endothelium that lines the blood vessels that connect to the heart. On the outer aspect of the myocardium is the epicardium which forms part of the pericardial sac that surrounds, protects, and lubricates the heart.

Within the myocardium, there are several sheets of cardiac muscle cells or cardiomyocytes. The sheets of muscle that wrap around the left ventricle closest to the endocardium are oriented perpendicularly to those closest to the epicardium. When these sheets contract in a coordinated manner they allow the ventricle to squeeze in several directions simultaneously – longitudinally (becoming shorter from apex to base), radially (becoming narrower from side to side), and with a twisting motion (similar to wringing out a damp cloth) to squeeze the maximum possible amount of blood out of the heart with each heartbeat.

Contracting heart muscle uses a lot of energy, and therefore requires a constant flow of blood to provide oxygen and nutrients. Blood is brought to the myocardium by the coronary arteries. These originate from the aortic root and lie on the outer or epicardial surface of the heart. Blood is then drained away by the coronary veins into the right atrium.

=== Microanatomy ===
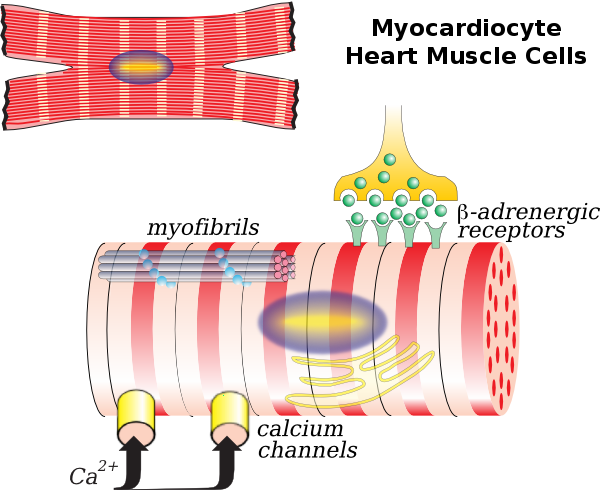
Illustration of a cardiac muscle cell.

An isolated cardiac muscle cell, beating

Cardiac muscle cells (also called cardiomyocytes) are the contractile myocytes of the cardiac muscle. The cells are surrounded by an extracellular matrix produced by supporting fibroblast cells. Specialised modified cardiomyocytes known as pacemaker cells, set the rhythm of the heart contractions. The pacemaker cells are only weakly contractile without sarcomeres, and are connected to neighboring contractile cells via gap junctions. They are located in the sinoatrial node (the primary pacemaker) positioned on the wall of the right atrium, near the entrance of the superior vena cava. Other pacemaker cells are found in the atrioventricular node (secondary pacemaker).

Pacemaker cells carry the impulses that are responsible for the beating of the heart. They are distributed throughout the heart and are responsible for several functions. First, they are responsible for being able to spontaneously generate and send out electrical impulses. They also must be able to receive and respond to electrical impulses from the brain. Lastly, they must be able to transfer electrical impulses from cell to cell. Pacemaker cells in the sinoatrial node, and atrioventricular node are smaller and conduct at a relatively slow rate between the cells. Specialized conductive cells in the bundle of His, and the Purkinje fibers are larger in diameter and conduct signals at a fast rate.

The Purkinje fibers rapidly conduct electrical signals; coronary arteries to bring nutrients to the muscle cells, and veins and a capillary network to take away waste products.

Cardiac muscle cells are the contracting cells that allow the heart to pump. Each cardiomyocyte needs to contract in coordination with its neighboring cells - known as a functional syncytium - working to efficiently pump blood from the heart, and if this coordination breaks down then – despite individual cells contracting – the heart may not pump at all, such as may occur during abnormal heart rhythms such as ventricular fibrillation.

Viewed through a microscope, cardiac muscle cells are roughly rectangular, measuring 100–150μm by 30–40μm. Individual cardiac muscle cells are joined at their ends by intercalated discs to form long fibers. Each cell contains myofibrils, specialized protein contractile fibers of actin and myosin that slide past each other. These are organized into sarcomeres, the fundamental contractile units of muscle cells. The regular organization of myofibrils into sarcomeres gives cardiac muscle cells a striped or striated appearance when looked at through a microscope, similar to skeletal muscle. These striations are caused by lighter I bands composed mainly of actin, and darker A bands composed mainly of myosin.

Cardiomyocytes contain T-tubules, pouches of cell membrane that run from the cell surface to the cell's interior which help to improve the efficiency of contraction. The majority of these cells contain only one nucleus (some may have two central nuclei), unlike skeletal muscle cells which contain many nuclei. Cardiac muscle cells contain many mitochondria which provide the energy needed for the cell in the form of adenosine triphosphate (ATP), making them highly resistant to fatigue.

==== T-tubules ====
T-tubules are microscopic tubes that run from the cell surface to deep within the cell. They are continuous with the cell membrane, are composed of the same phospholipid bilayer, and are open at the cell surface to the extracellular fluid that surrounds the cell. T-tubules in cardiac muscle are bigger and wider than those in skeletal muscle, but fewer in number. In the centre of the cell they join, running into and along the cell as a transverse-axial network. Inside the cell they lie close to the cell's internal calcium store, the sarcoplasmic reticulum. Here, a single tubule pairs with part of the sarcoplasmic reticulum, called a terminal cisterna, in a combination known as a diad.

The functions of T-tubules include rapidly transmitting electrical impulses known as action potentials from the cell surface to the cell's core, and helping to regulate the concentration of calcium within the cell in a process known as excitation-contraction coupling. They are also involved in mechano-electric feedback, as evident from cell contraction induced T-tubular content exchange (advection-assisted diffusion), which was confirmed by confocal and 3D electron tomography observations.

==== Intercalated discs ====
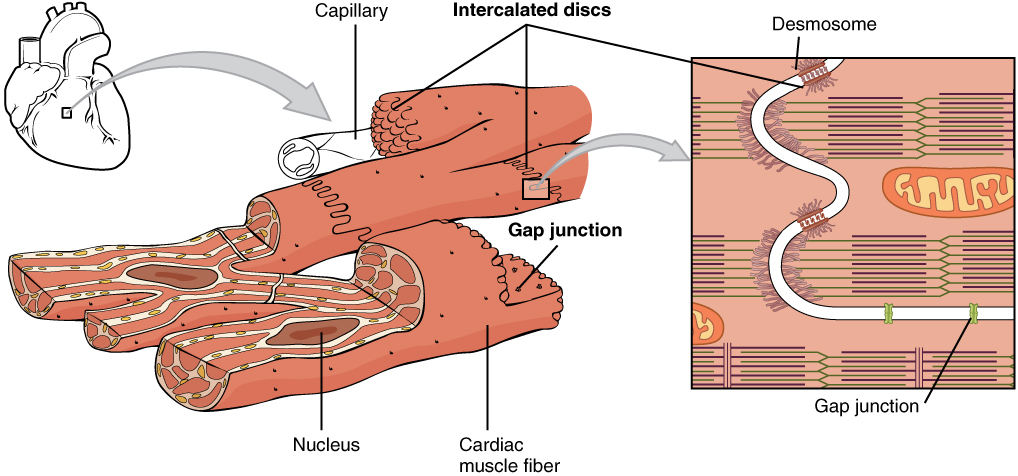
Intercalated discs are part of the cardiac muscle cell sarcolemma and they contain gap junctions and desmosomes.

The cardiac syncytium is a network of cardiomyocytes connected by intercalated discs that enable the rapid transmission of electrical impulses through the network, enabling the syncytium to act in a coordinated contraction of the myocardium. There is an atrial syncytium and a ventricular syncytium that are connected by cardiac connection fibres. Electrical resistance through intercalated discs is very low, thus allowing free diffusion of ions. The ease of ion movement along cardiac muscle fibers axes is such that action potentials are able to travel from one cardiac muscle cell to the next, facing only slight resistance. Each syncytium obeys the all or none law.

Intercalated discs are complex adhering structures that connect the single cardiomyocytes to an electrochemical syncytium (in contrast to the skeletal muscle, which becomes a multicellular syncytium during embryonic development). The discs are responsible mainly for force transmission during muscle contraction. Intercalated discs consist of three different types of cell-cell junctions: the actin filament anchoring fascia adherens junctions, the intermediate filament anchoring desmosomes, and gap junctions. They allow action potentials to spread between cardiac cells by permitting the passage of ions between cells, producing depolarization of the heart muscle. The three types of junction act together as a single area composita.

Under light microscopy, intercalated discs appear as thin, typically dark-staining lines dividing adjacent cardiac muscle cells. The intercalated discs run perpendicular to the direction of muscle fibers. Under electron microscopy, an intercalated disc's path appears more complex. At low magnification, this may appear as a convoluted electron dense structure overlying the location of the obscured Z-line. At high magnification, the intercalated disc's path appears even more convoluted, with both longitudinal and transverse areas appearing in longitudinal section.

==== Fibroblasts ====
Cardiac fibroblasts are vital supporting cells within cardiac muscle. They are unable to provide forceful contractions like cardiomyocytes, but instead are largely responsible for creating and maintaining the extracellular matrix which surrounds the cardiomyocytes. Fibroblasts play a crucial role in responding to injury, such as a myocardial infarction. Following injury, fibroblasts can become activated and turn into myofibroblasts – cells which exhibit behaviour somewhere between a fibroblast (generating extracellular matrix) and a smooth muscle cell (ability to contract). In this capacity, fibroblasts can repair an injury by creating collagen while gently contracting to pull the edges of the injured area together.

Fibroblasts are smaller but more numerous than cardiomyocytes, and several fibroblasts can be attached to a cardiomyocyte at once. When attached to a cardiomyocyte they can influence the electrical currents passing across the muscle cell's surface membrane, and in the context are referred to as being electrically coupled, as originally shown in vitro and in the 1960s, and ultimately confirmed in native cardiac tissue with the help of optogenetic techniques. Other potential roles for fibroblasts include electrical insulation of the cardiac conduction system, and the ability to transform into other cell types including cardiomyocytes and adipocytes.

==== Extracellular matrix ====
The extracellular matrix (ECM) surrounds the cardiomyocyte and fibroblasts. The ECM is composed of proteins including collagen and elastin along with polysaccharides (sugar chains) known as glycosaminoglycans. Together, these substances give support and strength to the muscle cells, create elasticity in cardiac muscle, and keep the muscle cells hydrated by binding water molecules.

The matrix in immediate contact with the muscle cells is referred to as the basement membrane, mainly composed of type IV collagen and laminin. Cardiomyocytes are linked to the basement membrane via specialised glycoproteins called integrins.

== Development ==
Humans are born with a set number of heart muscle cells, or cardiomyocytes, which increase in size as the heart grows larger during childhood development. Evidence suggests that cardiomyocytes are slowly turned over during aging, but less than 50% of the cardiomyocytes present at birth are replaced during a normal life span. The growth of individual cardiomyocytes not only occurs during normal heart development, it also occurs in response to extensive exercise (athletic heart syndrome), heart disease, or heart muscle injury such as after a myocardial infarction. A healthy adult cardiomyocyte has a cylindrical shape that is approximately 100μm long and 10–25μm in diameter. Cardiomyocyte hypertrophy occurs through sarcomerogenesis, the creation of new sarcomere units in the cell. During heart volume overload, cardiomyocytes grow through eccentric hypertrophy. The cardiomyocytes extend lengthwise but have the same diameter, resulting in ventricular dilation. During heart pressure overload, cardiomyocytes grow through concentric hypertrophy. The cardiomyocytes grow larger in diameter but have the same length, resulting in heart wall thickening.

== Physiology ==
The physiology of cardiac muscle shares many similarities with that of skeletal muscle. The primary function of both muscle types is to contract, and in both cases, a contraction begins with a characteristic flow of ions across the cell membrane known as an action potential. The cardiac action potential subsequently triggers muscle contraction by increasing the concentration of calcium within the cytosol.

=== Cardiac cycle ===
The cardiac cycle is the performance of the human heart from the beginning of one heartbeat to the beginning of the next. It consists of two periods: one during which the heart muscle relaxes and refills with blood, called diastole, following a period of robust contraction and pumping of blood, dubbed systole. After emptying, the heart immediately relaxes and expands to receive another influx of blood returning from the lungs and other systems of the body, before again contracting to pump blood to the lungs and those systems. A normally performing heart must be fully expanded before it can efficiently pump again.

The rest phase is considered polarized. The resting potential during this phase of the beat separates the ions such as sodium, potassium, and calcium. Myocardial cells possess the property of automaticity or spontaneous depolarization. This is the direct result of a membrane which allows sodium ions to slowly enter the cell until the threshold is reached for depolarization. Calcium ions follow and extend the depolarization even further. Once calcium stops moving inward, potassium ions move out slowly to produce repolarization. The very slow repolarization of the CMC membrane is responsible for the long refractory period.

However, the mechanism by which calcium concentrations within the cytosol rise differ between skeletal and cardiac muscle. In cardiac muscle, the action potential comprises an inward flow of both sodium and calcium ions. The flow of sodium ions is rapid but very short-lived, while the flow of calcium is sustained and gives the plateau phase characteristic of cardiac muscle action potentials. The comparatively small flow of calcium through the L-type calcium channels triggers a much larger release of calcium from the sarcoplasmic reticulum in a phenomenon known as calcium-induced calcium release. In contrast, in skeletal muscle, minimal calcium flows into the cell during action potential and instead the sarcoplasmic reticulum in these cells is directly coupled to the surface membrane. This difference can be illustrated by the observation that cardiac muscle fibers require calcium to be present in the solution surrounding the cell to contract, while skeletal muscle fibers will contract without extracellular calcium.

During contraction of a cardiac muscle cell, the long protein myofilaments oriented along the length of the cell slide over each other in what is known as the sliding filament theory. There are two kinds of myofilaments, thick filaments composed of the protein myosin, and thin filaments composed of the proteins actin, troponin and tropomyosin. As the thick and thin filaments slide past each other the cell becomes shorter and fatter. In a mechanism known as cross-bridge cycling, calcium ions bind to the protein troponin, which along with tropomyosin then uncover key binding sites on actin. Myosin, in the thick filament, can then bind to actin, pulling the thick filaments along the thin filaments. When the concentration of calcium within the cell falls, troponin and tropomyosin once again cover the binding sites on actin, causing the cell to relax.

=== Regeneration ===
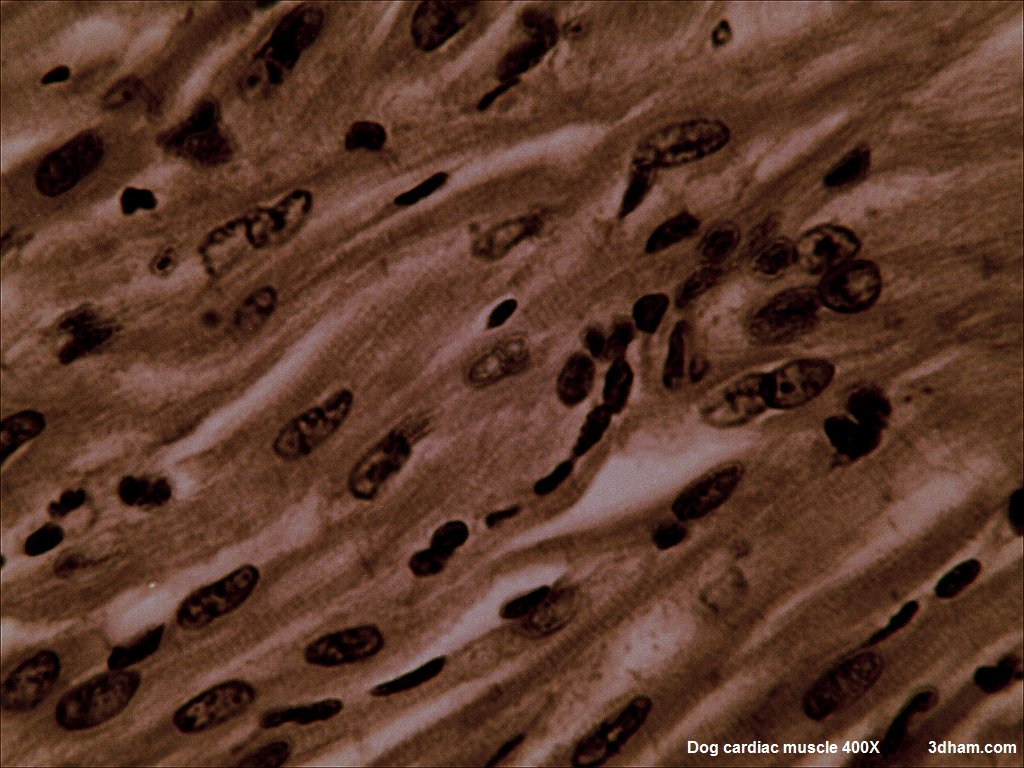
Dog cardiac muscle (400X)

It was commonly believed that cardiac muscle cells could not be regenerated. However, this was contradicted by a report published in 2009. Olaf Bergmann and his colleagues at the Karolinska Institute in Stockholm tested samples of heart muscle from people born before 1955 who had very little cardiac muscle around their heart, many showing with disabilities from this abnormality. By using DNA samples from many hearts, the researchers estimated that a 4-year-old renews about 20% of heart muscle cells per year, and about 69% of the heart muscle cells of a 50-year-old were generated after they were born.

One way that cardiomyocyte regeneration occurs is through the division of pre-existing cardiomyocytes during the normal aging process.

In the 2000s, the discovery of adult endogenous cardiac stem cells was reported, and studies were published that claimed that various stem cell lineages, including bone marrow stem cells were able to differentiate into cardiomyocytes, and could be used to treat heart failure. However, other teams were unable to replicate these findings, and many of the original studies were later retracted for scientific fraud.

=== Differences between atria and ventricles ===
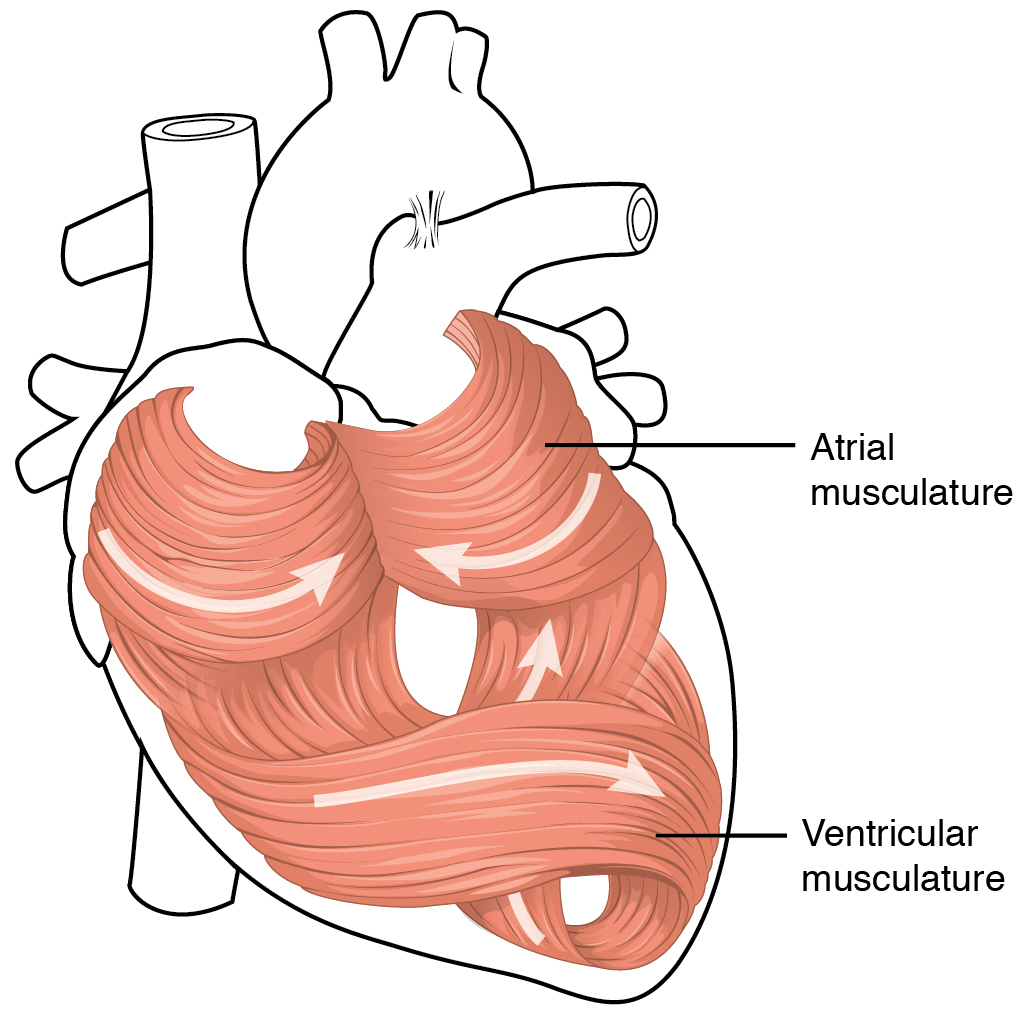
The swirling musculature of the heart ensures effective pumping of blood.

Cardiac muscle forms both the atria and the ventricles of the heart. Although this muscle tissue is very similar between cardiac chambers, some differences exist. The myocardium found in the ventricles is thick to allow forceful contractions, while the myocardium in the atria is much thinner. The individual myocytes that make up the myocardium also differ between cardiac chambers. Ventricular cardiomyocytes are longer and wider, with a denser T-tubule network. Although the fundamental mechanisms of calcium handling are similar between ventricular and atrial cardiomyocytes, the calcium transient is smaller and decays more rapidly in atrial myocytes, with a corresponding increase in calcium buffering capacity. The complement of ion channels differs between chambers, leading to longer action potential durations and effective refractory periods in the ventricles. Certain ion currents such as I_{K(UR)} are highly specific to atrial cardiomyocytes, making them a potential target for treatments for atrial fibrillation.

== Clinical significance ==
Diseases affecting cardiac muscle, known as cardiomyopathies, are the leading cause of death in developed countries. The most common condition is coronary artery disease, in which the blood supply to the heart is reduced. The coronary arteries become narrowed by the formation of atherosclerotic plaques. If these narrowings become severe enough to partially restrict blood flow, the syndrome of angina pectoris may occur. This typically causes chest pain during exertion that is relieved by rest. If a coronary artery suddenly becomes very narrowed or completely blocked, interrupting or severely reducing blood flow through the vessel, a myocardial infarction or heart attack occurs. If the blockage is not relieved promptly by medication, percutaneous coronary intervention, or surgery, then a heart muscle region may become permanently scarred and damaged. Specific cardiomyopathies include: increased left ventricular mass (hypertrophic cardiomyopathy), abnormally large (dilated cardiomyopathy), or abnormally stiff (restrictive cardiomyopathy). Some of these conditions are caused by genetic mutations and can be inherited.

Heart muscle can also become damaged despite a normal blood supply. The heart muscle may become inflamed in a condition called myocarditis, most commonly caused by a viral infection but sometimes caused by the body's own immune system. Heart muscle can also be damaged by drugs such as alcohol, long standing high blood pressure or hypertension, or persistent abnormal heart racing. Many of these conditions, if severe enough, can damage the heart so much that the pumping function of the heart is reduced. If the heart is no longer able to pump enough blood to meet the body's needs, this is described as heart failure.

Significant damage to cardiac muscle cells is referred to as myocytolysis which is considered a type of cellular necrosis defined as either coagulative or colliquative.

== See also ==
- Frank–Starling law of the heart
- Nebulette
- Protein S100-A1
- Regional function of the heart
- List of distinct cell types in the adult human body
