= William B. Kouwenhoven =

American electrical engineer and academic (1886–1975)

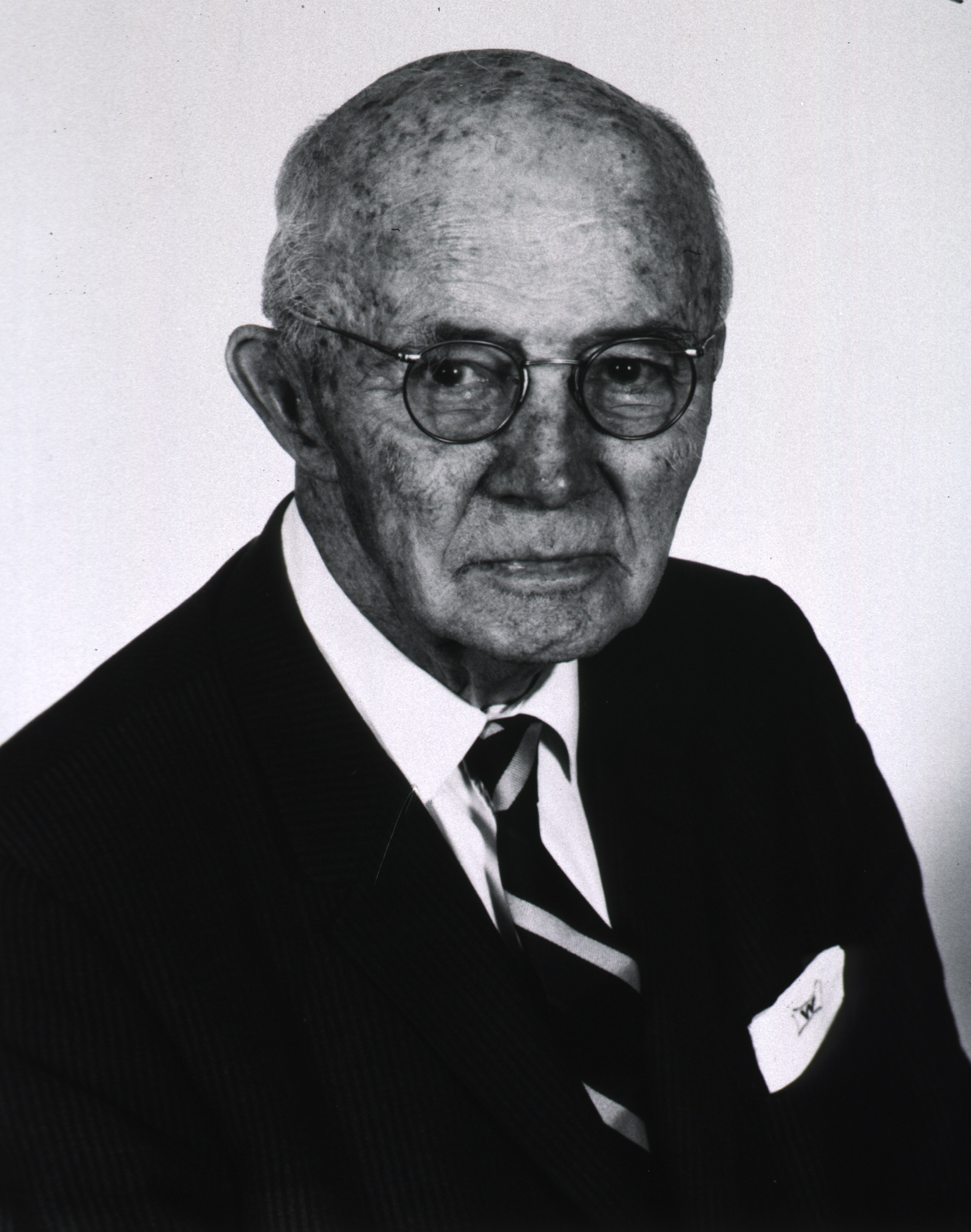
- Born: 3 January 1886; Brooklyn, New York, U.S.
- Died: 10 November 1975 (aged 89); Baltimore, Maryland, U.S.
- Education: Polytechnic Institute of Brooklyn
- Known for: Inventing the electric cardiac defibrillator
- Awards: IEEE Edison Medal (1961) Lasker-DeBakey Award - Clinical Medical Research (1973)
- Scientific career
- Fields: Electrical Engineering
- Workplaces: Johns Hopkins University

William Bennet Kouwenhoven (13 January 1886 – 10 November 1975) was an American electrical engineer. Known as the "Father of Cardiopulmonary Resuscitation", he is best known for his contributions to the development of the closed-chest cardiac massage and his invention of the cardiac defibrillator. After obtaining his doctorate degree in engineering from the Karlsruhe Technische Hochschule in Germany, Kouwenhoven began his career as the dean at the Johns Hopkins University in Baltimore. Kouwenhoven focused his research mainly on improving and saving lives of patients through the application of electricity. With the help and cooperation of the Johns Hopkins School of Medicine's Department of Surgery and an Edison Electric Institute grant, Kouwenhoven was able to develop a closed-chest defibrillator. For his contributions to the field of medical science, he became the first ever recipient of an honorary degree conferred by the Johns Hopkins School of Medicine. Two years before his death, Kouwenhoven was also awarded the Albert Lasker Award for Clinical Medical Research.

== Biography ==
=== Early life and education ===
William Bennet Kouwenhoven was born in Brooklyn, NY, on January 13, 1886. Kouwenhoven attended the Polytechnic Institute of Brooklyn beginning in 1903. As a college freshman, Kouwenhoven was intrigued by the relationship between electricity and medicine, which later became the topics for his English thesis. Three years later, he graduated with a BA in electrical engineering. Then in 1907, he earned his MS in mechanical engineering and began teaching physics and electrical engineering at the institute. In 1910, Kouwenhoven married Abigail Baxter Remsen and traveled to Germany to study at the Karlsruhe Technische Hochschule. Kouwenhoven had only one child, whom he named William G. Kouwenhoven. After obtaining his doctorate in engineering in 1913, Kouwenhoven moved back to the United States. He then taught engineering at Washington University in St. Louis for a year.

=== Career at Johns Hopkins ===
In 1914, William Kouwenhoven was hired as a professor at Johns Hopkins University's School of Engineering. His research interests consisted of the effects of electricity on the human body and cardiac arrest. By 1919, he worked as an associate professor at Johns Hopkins and was later promoted to full professor in 1930. Kouwenhoven was able to hold that position for 24 years during his tenure at Johns Hopkins. Due to the success of his research, Kouwenhoven was promoted to an administrative position as the Dean of Johns Hopkins University's School of Engineering from 1938 to 1954. During his tenure as dean, Kouwenhoven developed and perfected his most famous project on the electric cardiac defibrillator. At the age of 68, William Kouwenhoven retired as dean but continued to focus on his medical research at Hopkins after retirement. By the end of his career at Hopkins, Kouwenhoven was awarded two awards for his work at the institution: the Edison Medal (1961) and the Albert Lasker Clinical Medical Research Award.

=== Personal life ===
Kouwenhoven's colleagues and family members recall him as a "fascinating guy. According to Guy Knickerbocker, one of Kouwenhoven's electrical engineering students, Kouwenhoven's nickname 'Wild Bill' "carried some credibility. Being brought up in Brooklyn, he was colorful. On the other hand, he [also] had a generous side." One of Kouwenhoven's grandchildren, Nick Kouwenhoven who currently works for Tessco Technologies in Baltimore, remembers his grandfather to be "an extremely intense and competitive man. As a teacher, he was known for being demanding, but...he secretly paid for kids who showed promise to go to school." Further statements by Nick reveal that William Kouwenhoven "was a complicated man; he could be charming and then reveal his underlying stubborn nature. [However, he] was always trying to improve upon his work. Many family dinners included his graduate students, and the conversation frequently turned to the subject of their work." Gil Kaisler was one of these graduate students and had helped design the original portable AC generator used to build the closed-chest defibrillator. According to Kaisler, Kouwenhoven was a "tinkerer, a builder of things from the ground up. He also excelled as a teacher and administrator, but in the far grander scale, he did something to help countless people."

== Electric cardiac defibrillator ==
=== Open-chest defibrillator ===
By the 20th century, electricity was gradually integrated into society. Due to his interest in the field, William Kouwenhoven began to rewire old houses with electricity when he was a college graduate. However, a problem arose when utility linemen, who were setting up electricity lines, started to die from ventricular fibrillation (VF).

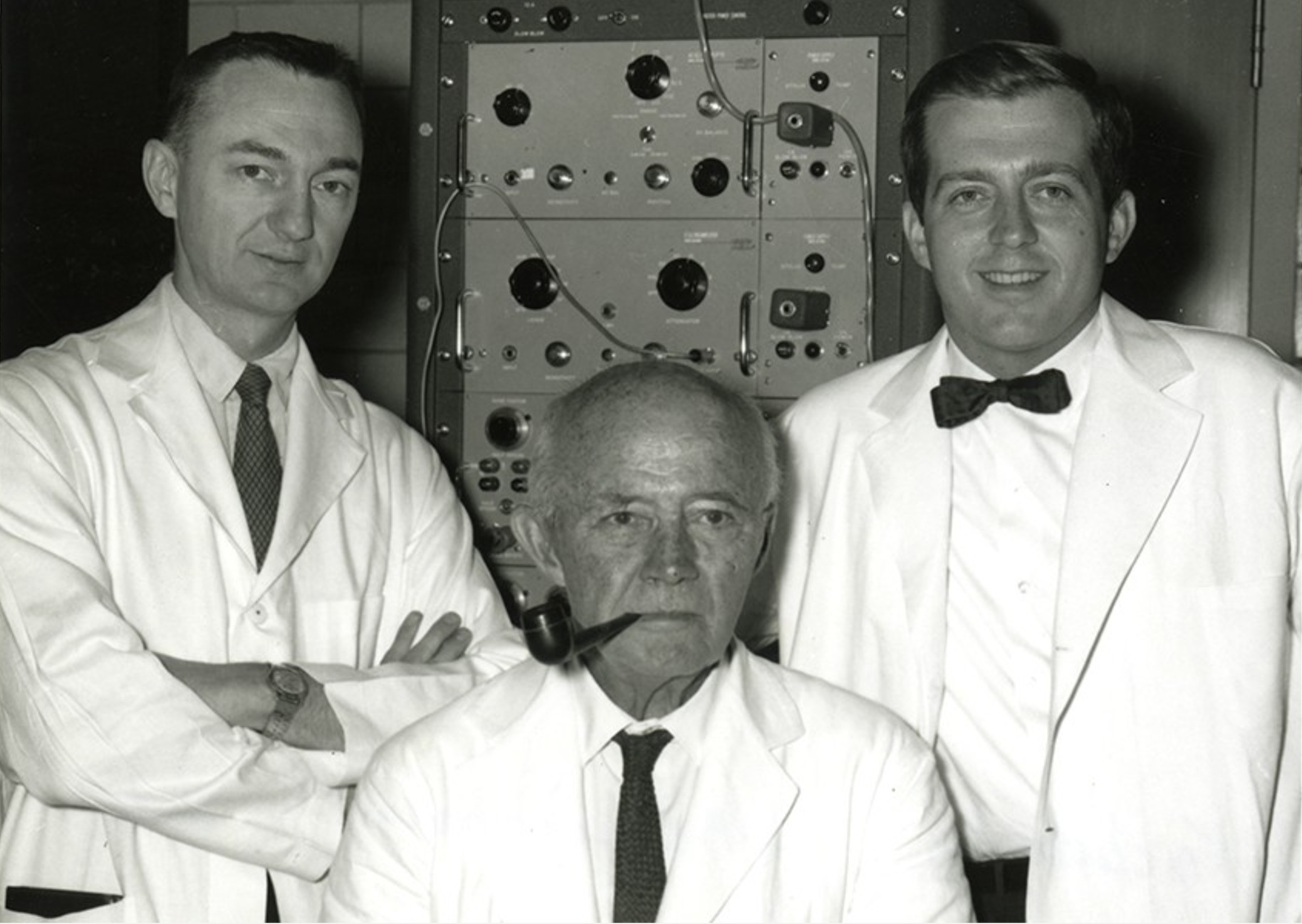
James Jude, William Kouwenhoven, and Guy Knickerbocker

William Kouwenhoven's research focused on the effects of electricity on the heart, and he wanted to develop an instrument that would revive or shock the heart without invasive surgery. The first procedures were done on rats and dogs, but both investigations failed to produce groundbreaking results. Then, in 1925, the Johns Hopkins School of Hygiene and Public Health was offered a $10,000 award by the Consolidated Edison of New York in collaboration with Simon Flexner and the Rockefeller Institute to investigate and examine the effects of electricity on the human body. The principal investigator of this Consolidated Edison study, Johns Hopkins neurologist Othello Langworthy, brought William Kouwenhoven, who was currently the professor of electrical engineering, to this team. By 1928, Kouwenhoven and his team were able to observe the effects of DC and AC shock on the heart. They noticed that when low-voltage shocks were applied to the heart, ventricular fibrillation was induced. Kouwenhoven also discovered that high voltage shocks from the electrodes placed on the rats' heads caused the heart to stop pumping blood because the lungs had shut down completely.

Another method Kouwenhoven used to revive the hearts of rats was by giving CPR and massaging their chests. However, this failed because massaging the chests resulted in the paralysis of the rats due to their crushed cervical spines. By the year 1933, Kouwenhoven switched his research focus onto dogs. He detected that delivering a second surge of electricity, also known as a countershock, led to the restoration of the sinus rhythm and normal heart contraction. The dog's heart originally went through ventricular fibrillation, which occurs when the heart goes through rapid, electric impulses. However, through a process called defibrillation, the heart was able to be revived.

The news of Kouwenhoven's finding began altering the approach to cardiac care. Despite the high risks of the procedure, it was used by doctors at Case Western School of Medicine. In 1947, Claude Beck, M.D., became the first surgeon ever to place electrodes directly on a heart that was in ventricular fibrillation during a surgery. Kouwenhoven's studies also influenced the Division of Anesthesiology at Johns Hopkins School of Medicine. In the 1940s, researchers James Elam and Peter Safir perfected the emergency mouth-to-mouth method of lung ventilation, which is essential for oxygenating the blood when the heart is no longer functioning.

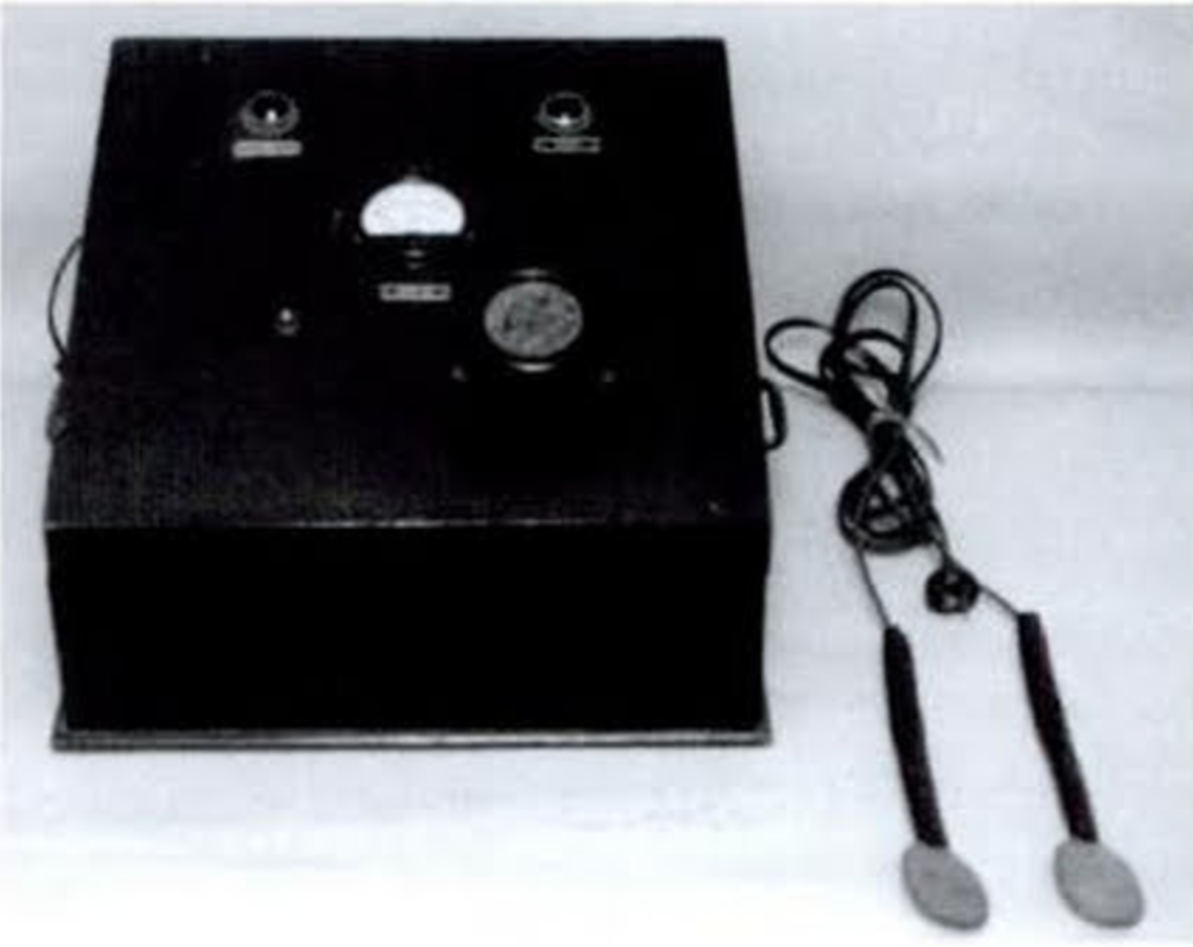
Defibrillator used by Claude Beck in 1947.

=== Closed-chest defibrillator ===
In 1950, Kouwenhoven began his research on a closed-chest defibrillator. Alfred Blalock, the Chief of Surgery at the time, was dubious at first regarding Kouwenhoven's ideas. However, he soon agreed to provide laboratory space and equipment for Kouwenhoven's studies. At first, Kouwenhoven and his team monitored the effect of electrodes on the opposite sides of the chest. They noted that a brief AC current of 20 amperes was able to jolt a heart from ventricular fibrillation back into a normal sinus rhythm. Samuel Talbot, a surgeon who was studying heart arrhythmias in dogs at the time, asked Kouwenhoven to merge his research on a defibrillator with Talbot's studies. Afterward, Kouwenhoven observed that the current flowed best vertically instead of horizontally when passed through a dog's heart. By noticing this, he was able to decrease the shock's intensity by 50 percent.

By 1957, Kouwenhoven and his team had designed a prototype specifically to work on humans. This novel device weighed approximately 200 pounds and consisted of a small box with two insulated cables with copper electrodes, which administered an AC current. One electrode was to be placed over the suprasternal notch, and the other electrode was to be placed over the apex of the heart. In 1961, Kouwenhoven and his team were able to launch the first truly portable defibrillator with the help and support of Mine Safety Appliance Company of Pittsburg. This new portable device weighed 45 pounds, and it could fit in a small plastic suitcase.

Guy Knickerbocker, an electrical engineer working at Kouwenhoven's laboratory, discovered that the copper electrodes caused a rise in blood pressure in the rest of the body when they were pressed down onto a dog's chest even before the current was passed through them. He hypothesized that massaging the chest in a rhythmical manner causes the blood to circulate. This observation paved the path for the third major discovery by Kouwenhoven's team: cardiopulmonary resuscitation also known as CPR.

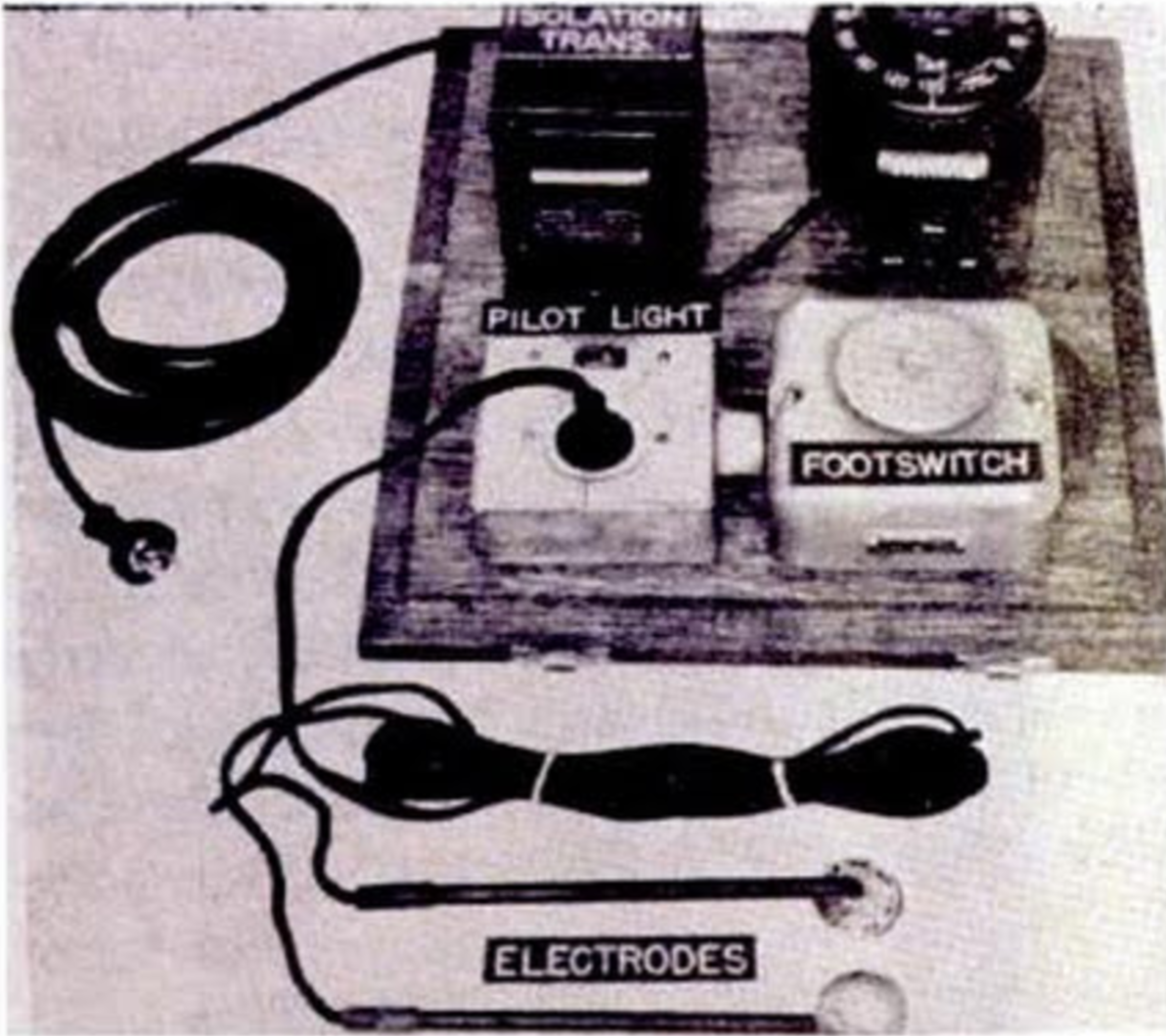
Closed-Chest Defibrillator developed at Johns Hopkins University.

== First successful case ==
In the year 1957, the defibrillator was used for the first time to save the life of a patient suffering from ventricular fibrillation in an operating room at the Johns Hopkins Hospital. Around 2 a.m., a patient entered the Hopkins emergency room complaining of indigestion. While undressing for his examination, the patient collapsed when his heart went into ventricular fibrillation. The resident at the time, Gottlieb Friesinger, M.D., had assisted Kouwenhoven in his studies dealing with the closed-chest defibrillator. As the intern performed CPR on the patient's chest, Friesinger rushed to the laboratory located on the hospital's 11th floor. He managed to persuade the security officer to let him take the defibrillator, which was mounted on a wheeled cart. After returning to the ER, Friesinger administered the first shock, which failed to restart the patient's heart. However, the second shock was able to revive the patient's heart back to a normal sinus rhythm. It was later discovered that the patient had suffered an anterior myocardial infarction. This case became known as the world's first emergency defibrillation for a cardiac arrest. Friesinger later remarked that "he was quite a dramatic Saturday morning Grand Rounds presentation."

== Awards and accomplishments ==
After being appointed as the Associate Dean of the School of Engineering at Johns Hopkins University, Kouwenhoven was also offered the position of vice-president of the American Institute of Electrical Engineers (AIEE). He served as the vice-president from 1931 to 1933 and two years later became a member of the AIEE Board of Directors. In 1961, Kouwenhoven received the IEEE Edison Medal presented by the AIEE (now IEEE) "for his inspiring leadership in education, for his contributions in the fields of electrical insulation, electrical measurements, and electrical science applied to medicine." In 1969, Kouwenhoven became the first-ever recipient of an honorary degree presented by the Johns Hopkins School of Medicine for his contributions to medical science. Two years before his death, in 1973, Kouwenhoven was presented with one of the most prestigious biomedical prizes in America: the Albert Lasker Award for Clinical Medical Research. When he died in 1975, the New York Times obituary recognized Kouwenhoven's accomplishments and contributions by stating that he had "helped develop basic cardiac treatment devices and procedures used around the world."

In Kouwenhoven's honor and memory, the Whiting School of Engineering at Johns Hopkins University established the William B. Kouwenhoven Professorship in Electrical Engineering in 1981. The current holder of this Kouwenhoven Professorship is Jerry L. Prince, the associate director for research at the Center of Computer Integrated Surgical Systems and Technology. Prince has worked on co-developing HARP MRI, which provides doctors with the ability to assess the condition of heart muscles within seconds. He is also currently researching image processing and computer vision with primary application to medical imaging.

== Publications ==
Hooker DR, Kouwenhoven WB, Langworthy OR. "The effect of alternating electrical currents on the heart." American Journal of Physiology 1933; 103:444–454

Jude JR, Kouwenhoven WB, Knickerbocker GG. External cardiac resuscitation. Monographs in Surgical Science 1964; I:65

Kouwenhoven WB, Jude JR, Knickerbocker GG. "Closed-chest cardiac massage." Journal of the American Medical Association 1960; 173:94–97.
