= Tissue engineering of heart valves =

Tissue engineered heart valves (TEHV) is a proposed treatment of creating a living heart valve for people who are in need of either a full or partial heart valve replacement. Currently, there are over a quarter of a million prosthetic heart valves implanted annually, and the number of patients requiring replacement surgeries is only suspected to rise and even triple over the next fifty years. While current treatments offered such as mechanical valves or biological valves are not deleterious to one's health, they both have their own limitations in that mechanical valves necessitate the lifelong use of anticoagulants while biological valves are susceptible to structural degradation and reoperation. Thus, in situ (in its original position or place) tissue engineering of heart valves serves as a novel approach that explores the use creating a living heart valve composed of the host's own cells that is capable of growing, adapting, and interacting within the human body's biological system.

Research has not yet reached the stage of clinical trials.

== Procedure ==
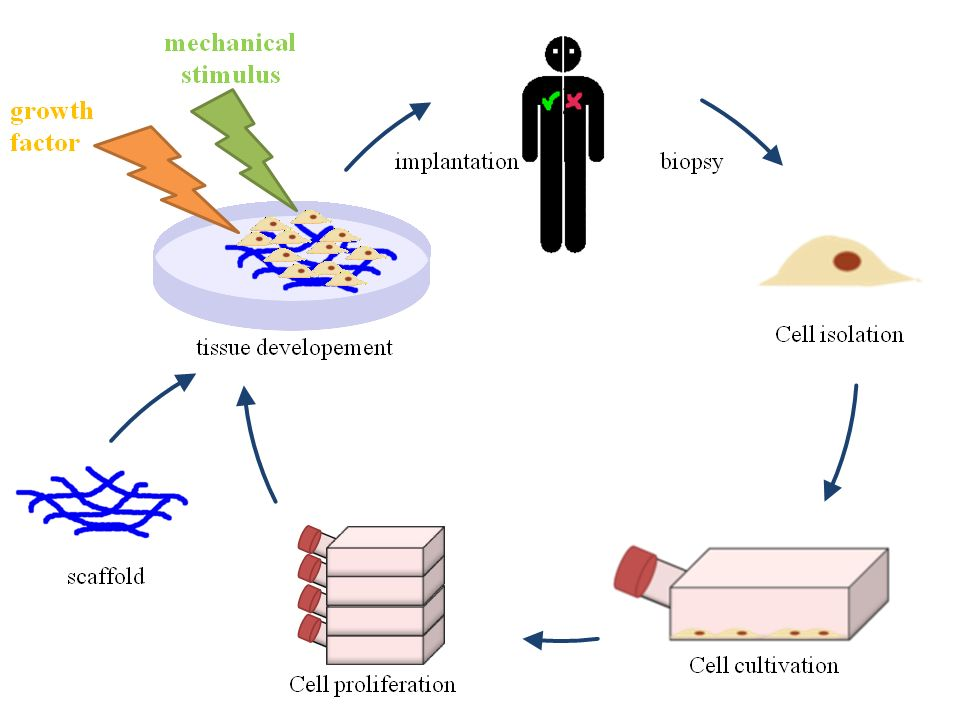
Seeding cells into scaffold ready for tissue engineering use and implantation

=== Scaffolds ===
Various biomaterials, whether they are biological, synthetic, or a combination of both, can be used to create scaffolds, which when implanted in a human body can promote host tissue regeneration. First, cells from the patient in which the scaffold will be implanted in are harvested. These cells are expanded and seeded into the created scaffold, which is then inserted inside the human body. The human body serves as a bioreactor, which allows the formation of an extracellular matrix (ECM) along with fibrous proteins around the scaffold to provide the necessary environment for the heart and circulatory system. The initial implantation of the foreign scaffold triggers various signaling pathways guided by the foreign body response for cell recruitment from neighboring tissues. The new nanofiber network surrounding the scaffold mimics the native ECM of the host body. Once cells begin to populate the cell, the scaffold is designed to gradually degrade, leaving behind a constructed heart valve made of the host body's own cells that is fully capable of cell repopulation and withstanding environmental changes within the body. The scaffold designed for tissue engineering is one of the most crucial components because it guides tissue construction, viability, and functionality long after implantation and degradation.

==== Biological ====
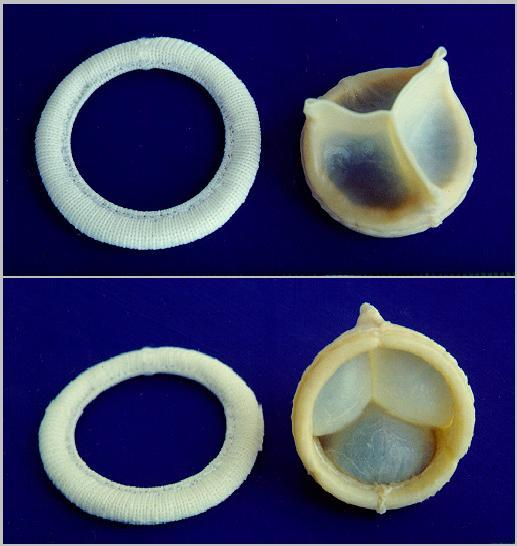
Decellularized tricuspid biological heart valve

Biological scaffolds can be created from human donor tissue or from animals; however, animal tissue is often more popular since it is more widely accessible and more plentiful. Xenograft, from a donor of a different species from the recipient, heart valves can be from either pigs, cows, or sheep. If either human or animal tissue is used, the first step in creating useful scaffolds is decellularization, which means to remove the cellular contents all the while preserving the ECM matrix, which is advantageous compared to manufacturing synthetic scaffolds from scratch. Many decellularization methods have been used such as the use of nonionic and ionic detergents that disrupt cellular material interactions or the use of enzymes to cleave peptide bonds, RNA, and DNA.

==== Fabricated ====
There are also current approaches that are manufacturing scaffolds and coupling them with biological cues. Fabricated scaffolds can also be manufactured using either biological, synthetic, or a combination of both materials from scratch to mimic the native heart valve observed using imaging techniques. Since the scaffold is created from raw materials, there is much more flexibility in controlling the scaffold's properties and can be more tailored. Some types of fabricated scaffolds include solid 3D porous scaffolds that have a large pore network that permits the flow through of cellular debris, allowing further tissue and vascular growth. 3D porous scaffolds can be manufactured through 3D printing or various polymers, ranging from polyglycolic acid (PGA) and polylactic acid (PLA) to more natural polymers such as collagen.

Fibrous scaffolds have the potential to closely match the structure of ECM through its use of fibers, which have a high growth factor. Techniques to produce fibrous scaffolds include electrospinning, in which a liquid solution of polymers is stretched from an applied high electric voltage to produce thin fibers. Conversely to the 3D porous scaffolds, fibrous scaffolds have a very small pore size that prevents the pervasion of cells within the scaffold.

Hydrogel scaffolds are created by cross-linking hydrophilic polymers through various reaction such as free radical polymerization or conjugate addition reaction. Hydrogels are beneficial because they have a high water content, which allows the ease of nutrients and small materials to pass through.

=== Biocompatibility ===
The biocompatibility of surgically implanted foreign biomaterial refers to the interactions between the biomaterial and the host body tissue. Cell line as well as cell type such as fibroblasts can largely impact tissue responses towards implanted foreign devices by changing cell morphology. Thus the cell source as well as protein adsorption, which is dependent on biomaterial surface property, play a crucial role in tissue response and cell infiltration at the scaffold site.

== Methodology ==
=== Inflammatory response ===
==== Acute inflammation ====
Implantation of any foreign device or material through the means of surgery results in at least some degree of tissue trauma. Therefore, especially when removing a native heart valve either partially or completely, the tissue trauma will trigger a cascade of inflammatory responses and elicit acute inflammation. During the initial phase of acute inflammation, vasodilation occurs to increase blood flow to the wound site along with the release of growth factors, cytokines, and other immune cells. Furthermore, cells release reactive oxygen species and cytokines, which cause secondary damage to surrounding tissue. These chemical factors then proceed to promote the recruitment of other immune responsive cells such as monocytes or white blood cells, which help foster the formation of a blood clot and protein-rich matrix.

===== Chronic inflammation =====
If the acute inflammatory response persists, the body then proceeds to undergo chronic inflammation. During this continual and systemic inflammation phase, one of the primary driving forces is the infiltration of macrophages. The macrophages and lymphocytes induce the formation of new tissues and blood vessels to help supply nutrients to the biomaterial site. New fibrous tissue then encapsulates the foreign biomaterial in order to minimize interactions between the biomaterial and surrounding tissue. While the prolonging of chronic inflammation may be a likely indicator for an infection, inflammation may on occasion be present upwards to five years post-surgery. Chronic inflammation marked by the presence of fibrosis and inflammatory cells was observed in rat cells 30 days post implantation of a device.

Following chronic inflammation, mineralization occurs approximately 60 days after implantation due to the buildup of cellular debris and calcification, which has the potential to compromise the functionality of biocompatible implanted devices in vivo.

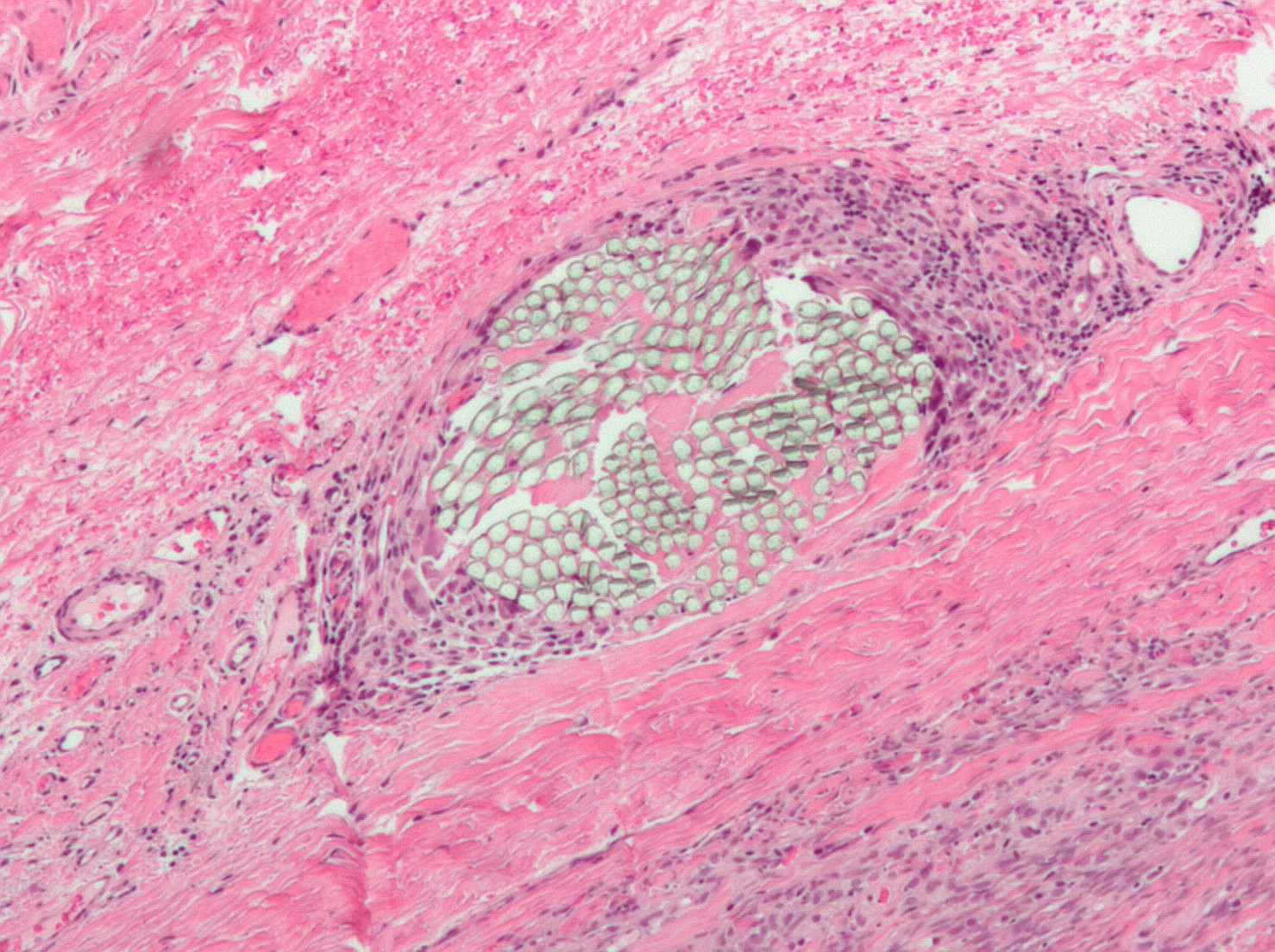
Multi-nucleated Foreign body giant cell (FBGC) from the fusion of macrophages

=== Foreign body response ===
Under normal physiological conditions, inflammatory cells protect the body from foreign objects, and the body undergoes a foreign body reaction based on the adsorption of blood and proteins on the biomaterial surface. In the first two to four weeks post implant, there is an association between biomaterial adherent macrophages and cytokine expression near the foreign implant site, which can be explored using semi-quantitative RT-PCR. Macrophages fuse together to form foreign body giant cells (FBGCs), which similarly express cytokine receptors on their cell membranes and actively participate in the inflammatory response. Device failure in organic polyether polyurethane (PEU) pacemakers compared to silicone rubber showcases that the foreign body response may indeed lead to degradation of biomaterials, causing subsequent device failures. The utilization of to prevent functionality and durability compromise is proposed to minimize and slow the rate of biomaterial degradation.

== Benefits ==
Tissue engineered heart valves offer certain advantages over traditional biological and mechanical valves:

- Living valve – The option of a living heart valve replacement is highly optimal for children as the live valve has the ability to grow and respond to its biological environment, which is especially beneficial for children whose bodies are continually changing. This option would help reduce the number of reoperation needed in a child's life.
- Customized process – Since the scaffolds used in tissue engineering can be manufactured from scratch, there is a higher degree of flexibility and control. This allows the potential of tailoring tissue engineered heart valves and its properties such as the scaffold's shape and biomaterial makeup to be tailored specifically to the patient.

== Risks and challenges ==
Diagram of the opened heart viewed from the front, displaying the complex anatomical geometry of valves

Many risks and challenges must still be addressed and explored before tissue engineered heart valves can fully be clinically implemented:

- Contamination – Particular source materials can foster a microbiological environment that is conducive to the susceptibility of viruses and infectious diseases. Anytime an external scaffold is implanted within the human body, contamination, while inevitable, can be diminished through the enforcement of sterile technique.
- Scaffold Interactions - There are many risks associated with the interactions between cells and the implanted scaffold as specific biocompatibility requirements are still largely unknown with current research. The response to these interactions are also highly individualistic, dependent on the specific patient's biological environment; therefore, animal models researched prior may not accurately portray outcomes in the human body. Due to the highly interactive nature between the scaffold and surrounding tissue, properties such as biodegradability, biocompatibility, and immunogenicity must all be carefully considered as they are key factors in the performance of the final product.
- Structural complexity – Heart valves with their heterogeneous structure are very complex and dynamic, thus posing a challenge for tissue engineered valves to mimic. The new valves must have high durability while also meeting the anatomical shape and mechanical functions of the native valve.

== History ==
=== Synthetic scaffolds ===
Studies performed seeded scaffolds made of polymers with various cell lines in vitro, in which the scaffolds degraded over time while leaving behind a cellular matrix and proteins. The first study on tissue engineering of heart valves was published in 1995. During 1995 and 1996, Shinoka used a scaffold made of polyglycolic acid (PGA), approved by the FDA for human implantation, and seeded it with sheep endothelial cells and fibroblasts with the goal of replacing a sheep's pulmonary valve leaflet. What resulted from Shinoka's study was an engineered heart valve that was much thicker and more rigid, which prompted Hoerstrup to conduct a study to replace all three pulmonary valve leaflets in a sheep using a poly-4-hydroxybutyrate (P4HB) coated PGA scaffold and sheep endothelial cells and myofibroblast.

=== Biological scaffolds ===
Another option studied was using decellularized biological scaffolds and seeding them with their corresponding cells in vitro. In 2000, Steinhoff implanted a decellularized sheep pulmonary valve scaffold seeded with sheep endothelial cells and myofibroblasts. Dohmen then created a decellularized cryopreserved pulmonary allograft scaffold and seeded it with human vascular endothelial cells to reconstruct the right ventricular outflow tract (RVOT) in a human patient in 2002. Perry in 2003 seeded a P4HB coated PGA scaffold with sheep mesenchymal stem cells in vitro; however, an in vivo study was not performed. In 2004, Iwai conducted a study using a poly(lactic-co-glycolic acid) PLGA compounded with collagen microsponge sphere scaffold, which was seeded with endothelial and smooth muscle cells at the site of a dog's pulmonary artery. Sutherland in 2005 utilized a sheep mesenchymal stem cell seeded PGA and poly-L-lactic acid (PLLA) scaffold to replace all three pulmonary valve leaflets in a sheep.

=== In vivo implant studies ===
A handful of studies utilized tissue engineering of heart valves in vivo in animal models and humans. In 2000, Matheny conducted a study in which he used a pig's small intestinal submucosa to replace one pulmonary valve leaflet. Limited studies have also been conducted in a clinical setting. For instance in 2001, Elkins implanted SynerGraft treated decellularized human pulmonary valves in patients. Simon similarly used SynerGraft decellularized pig valves for implantation in children; however, these valves widely failed as there were no host cells but rather high amounts of inflammatory cells found at the scaffold site instead. Studies led by Dohmen, Konertz, and colleagues in Berlin, Germany involved the implantation of a biological pig valve in 50 patients who underwent the Ross operation from 2002 to 2004. Using a decellularized porcine xenograft valve, also called Matrix P, in adults with a median age of 46 years, the aim of the study was to offer a proposal for pulmonary valve replacement. While some patients died postoperatively and had to undergo reoperation, the short-term results appear to be going well as the valve is behaving similarly to a native, healthy valve. One animal trial combined the transcatheter aortic valve replacement (TAVR) procedure with tissue engineered heart valves (TEHVs). A TAVR stent integrated with human cell-derived extracellular matrix was implanted and examined in sheep, in which the valve upheld structural integrity and cell infiltration, allowing the potential clinical application to extend TAVR to younger patients.

== Research ==
While many in vitro and in vivo studies have been tested in animal models, the translation from animal models to humans has not begun. Factors such as the size of surgical cut sites, duration of the procedure, and available resources and cost must all be considered. Synthetic nanomaterials have the potential to advance scaffoldings used in tissue engineering of heart valves. The use of nanotechnology could help expand beneficial properties of fabricated scaffolds such as higher tensile strength.

== See also ==
- Tissue engineering
- Valvular heart disease
- Valve replacement
- Artificial heart valve
- Nanotechnology
