= Decellularization of porcine heart valve =

Decellularization of porcine heart valves is the removal of cells along with antigenic cellular elements by either physical or chemical decellularization of the tissue. This decellularized valve tissue provides a scaffold with the remaining extracellular matrix (ECM) that can then be used for tissue engineering and valve replacement in humans inflicted with valvular disease. Decellularized biological valves have potential benefit over conventional valves through decreased calcification which is thought to be an immuno-inflammatory response initiated by the recipient.

== Valvular disease ==
Valvular disease is caused primarily by valvular lesions stemming from infections, especially rheumatic fever (Streptococceus pyogenes), which can result in either a regurgitant or stenotic valve, or both. Regurgitation results from lesions on the valve edges or annular dilation which causes backwards-flow of the blood. Stenosis results in thickened leaflets due to heavy fibrosis of the valve so blood cannot flow through normally. Stenotic valves require valve replacement however conventional valves have decreased lifespan due to an inflammatory response.

== Tissue engineering ==
Xenogeneic antigens are recognized as foreign by the human body and induce an immune-mediated rejection of tissue. Decellularization removes most cellular and nuclear components, and maintains the integrity of the valvular ECM, which is conserved and tolerated by transplant recipients.

Physical treatments- agitation, sonication, massage, freezing and thawing are used to remove cell contents from the ECM by disrupting cell membranes. These methods are usually used in conjunction with chemical treatments in order to achieve complete decellularization.

Chemical treatments- anionic detergent: (Sodium dodecyl sulfate (SDS)), sodium cholate, enzymatic agent (Trypsin), non-ionic detergent (Triton X-100) are all agents used to remove cells from the ECM scaffold by disrupting cellular proteins, while not affecting the mechanical strength and functional structure of the ECM through the maintenance of the collagen and elastin. Anionic detergents cause lysis by disrupting lipid-lipid interactions. Non-ionic detergents disrupts proteins required for critical function. Endonuclease can also be used to remove nucleic acid remnants.

Porcine valves are used for the regeneration of biological tissue through the use of its ECM as a biological scaffold. This tissue allows for rapid repopulation with host cells due to the cellular adhesive property of its surface. Newest procedures of porcine valve decellularization include immersion decellularization and perfusion decellularization.

== Benefits ==
Conventional mechanical valves used for replacement require anti-coagulation therapy which decreases quality of life. Xenogeneic biological values require glutaraldehyde treatment to decrease the immune response to the foreign valve. Still these valves eventually calcify and durability of the valve is decreased. Decellularized porcine valves are calcified to a lesser degree and may have increased mechanical strength due to decreased aggregation of IgG immunoglobins in response to alpha-Gal, which is significantly increased in conventional glutaraldehyde treated biological valves. Decellularized porcine valves have growth and remodeling potential as well.
