= Myocytolysis =

- Specialty: Cardiology

Myocytolysis refers to a state of significant damage to cardiac myocytes, muscle cells of the heart, caused by myocardial strain. It was first described in medical literature by Schlesinger and Reiner in 1955. It is considered a type of cellular necrosis. Two types of myocytolysis have been defined: coagulative and colliquative.

Coagulative myocytolysis appears in the myocardium near areas of coagulative necrosis or areas affected by myocardial infarction. This phenomenon tends to occur when neighboring cardiac muscle loses its ability to contract (i.e. in ischemia or infarction). The remaining viable muscles, as the result, strain to compensate for the loss of other muscles in order to deliver the necessary cardiac output. During the process, myocardial cells are stretched and stressed to produce new contractile elements.

In colliquative myocytolysis, fluids accumulated within the cell dissolve myofibrils, resulting in vacuolization of the cell. It is considered an indicator of acute myocardial ischemia and can be used to confirm ischemia in the absence of other indicators of cause of death.

== See also ==
- Myocardial infarction
- Myocardial ischaemia
