= Christos Davatzikos =

- Education: Johns Hopkins University (PhD)
- Scientific career
- Fields: Electrical and Computer Engineering
- Thesis: Geometric model-based estimations from projections
- Doctoral advisor: Jerry L. Prince

Christos Davatzikos is the Wallace T. Miller Sr. Professor of Radiology at the University of Pennsylvania was named Fellow of the Institute of Electrical and Electronics Engineers (IEEE) in 2014 "for contributions to automatic analysis and interpretation of biomedical multi-dimensional data".
