= Tomoelastography =

Medical imaging technique

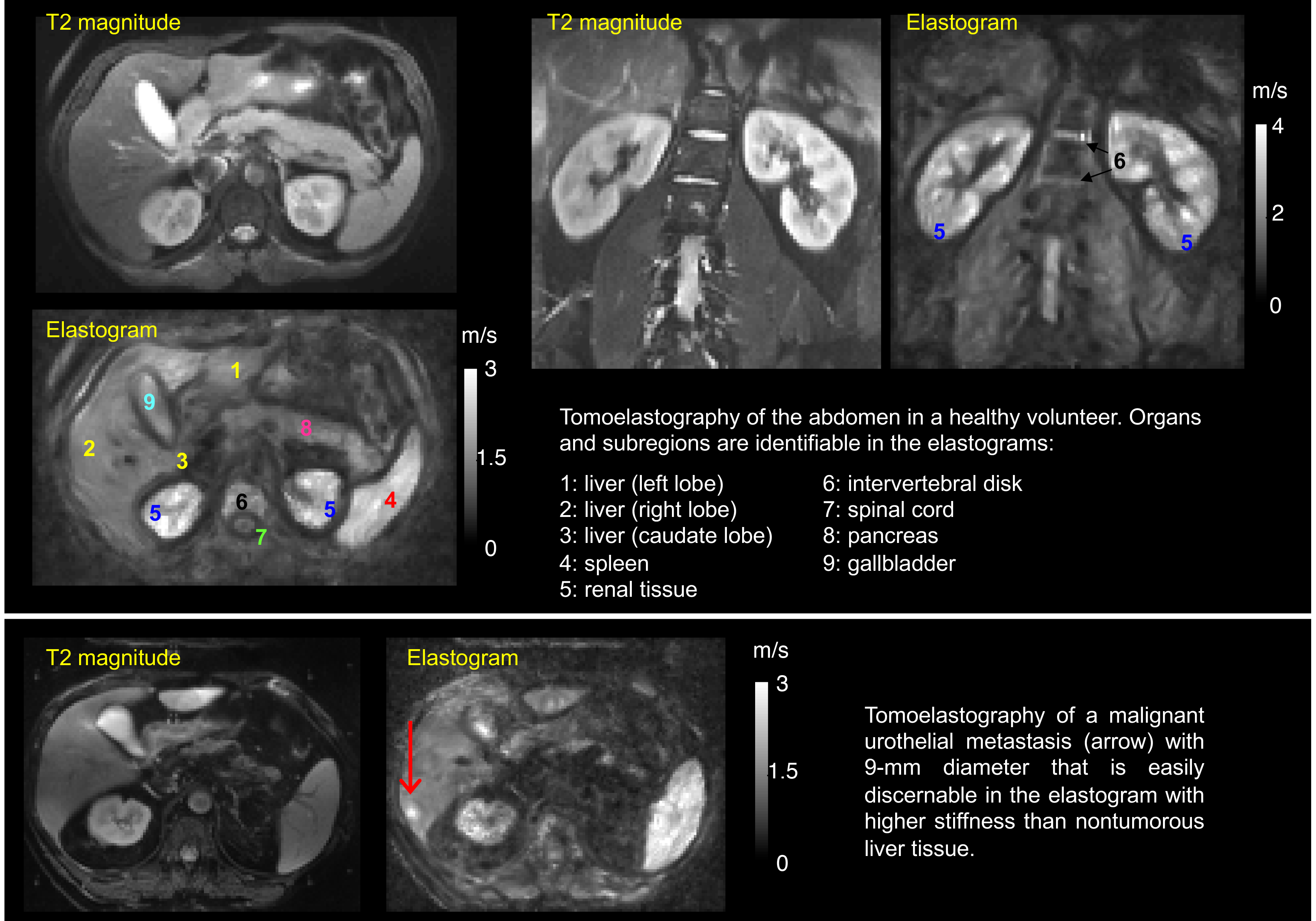
Tomoelastography of the abdomen; upper a healthy state, lower with malignancy.

Tomoelastography (from ancient Greek τόμος tomos, “slice” and elastography – imaging of viscoelastic properties) is a medical imaging technique that provides quantitative maps of the mechanical properties of biological soft tissues with high spatial resolution (called elastograms). It is an advancement of elastography in that it generates unmasked maps of stiffness and viscosity across the entire field of view that can be captured with a given imaging modality. Medical ultrasound and magnetic resonance imaging (MRI) are the most commonly used imaging modalities for elastography. Classical elastography only measures stiffness in a limited region, such as at a depth of 6 cm in the liver or in a selected liver lobe, and thus cannot provide an overview of the adjacent tissues or organs. Tomoelastography, on the other hand, is a radiological imaging method that allows estimation of quantitative mechanical parameters of all organs and structures in the field of view. Moreover, tomoelastography does not rely on a single, specific imaging modality. While it has been introduced and is mostly performed using magnetic resonance elastography (MRE), tomoelastography can be extended to other imaging techniques as well.

Tomoelastography requires external driver systems, which can efficiently generate shear waves throughout the entire field of view including tissues deep within the body. Multiple drivers can be combined such that waves propagate from the surface into the body from different directions to enable full illumination of larger regions with shear waves. Tomoelastography often employs mechanical vibrations at several driving frequencies for multifrequency wave analysis in order to stabilize inverse problem solutions for viscoelasticity reconstructions. A standard way of multifrequency viscoelasticity reconstruction is based on phase gradient analysis of plane waves whereas other methods employ solutions of the Helmholtz equation. The feasibility of tomoelastography was first demonstrated in the human abdomen using multifrequency MRE, where it was possible for the first time to display stiffness values (quantified as shear wave speed in m/s) across the entire axial MRI slice. Although the elastograms are quantitative maps, tomoelastography images, like other radiological images, are often presented in standard gray-scale which gives more perceptual contrast to the subtle nuances than the color-scale.

== Applications ==
Currently, most applications of tomoelastography are based on MRI, which is why tomoelastography is often referred to as an advanced MRE technique. Multifrequency-MRE based tomoelastography has been used for the diagnosis of diffuse liver disease, renal diseases such as renal allograft dysfunction, lupus nephritis, and immunoglobulin A nephropathy (IgAN). In addition, tomoelastography has been used for cancer imaging. In the liver, viscoelastic parameters of lesions less than 1 cm in diameter could be quantified for diagnostic purposes. Pancreatic cancer has been shown to be abnormally stiff compared to surrounding tissue, resulting in a large tumor contrast in elastograms. In the prostate, tomoelastography has been able to distinguish cancer from benign lesions.
