= Jerry L. Prince =

American computer scientist

Jerry Ladd Prince
- Education: Univ. of Connecticut (BS); M.I.T. (PhD)
- Known for: Gradient vector flow Harmonic phase Strain–encoded magnetic resonance imaging
- Scientific career
- Fields: Electrical and Computer Engineering
- Workplaces: Johns Hopkins University
- Thesis: Geometric model-based estimations from projections (1988)
- Doctoral advisor: Alan S. Willsky
- Doctoral students: Christos Davatzikos
- Website: https://iacl.ece.jhu.edu/

Jerry Ladd Prince is the William B. Kouwenhoven Professor of Electrical and Computer Engineering at Johns Hopkins University. He has over 50,000 citations, and an h-index of 94.

Prince received a BS degree in Electrical Engineering and Computer Science from the University of Connecticut, and a doctorate in Electrical Engineering from the Massachusetts Institute of Technology.

His research involves 3-D medical image reconstruction, registration, segmentation, and shape and motion analysis. He is noted for developing the Harmonic phase (HARP) algorithm for extracting and processing motion information from tagged magnetic resonance image (MRI) sequences for cardiac motion. He also holds appointments in the departments of Applied Mathematics and Statistics, and Computer Science at Johns Hopkins University, as well as in the departments of Biomedical Engineering and Radiology at the Johns Hopkins University School of Medicine. As such, he has been involved in "developing digital head models for faster, more precise diagnoses" of head injuries, such as those seen in sport.

Prince received a National Science Foundation Presidential Faculty Fellowship in 1993. He was associate editor of IEEE Transactions on Image Processing, associate editor of IEEE Transactions on Medical Imaging and as of 2020 was a member of the editorial board of Medical Image Analysis. In 2011, he become a Fellow of the MICCAI Society.

== Selected research ==
- Bian, Junguo, et al. "Evaluation of sparse-view reconstruction from flat-panel-detector cone-beam CT," Physics in Medicine & Biology 55(22):6575, 2010.
- Han, Xiao, Chenyang Xu, and Jerry L. Prince. "A topology preserving level set method for geometric deformable models," IEEE Transactions on Pattern Analysis and Machine Intelligence 25(6):755-768, 2003.
- Pham, Dzung L., Chenyang Xu, and Jerry L. Prince. "Current methods in medical image segmentation," Annual review of biomedical engineering 2(1):315-337, 2000.
- Xu, Chenyang, and Jerry L. Prince. "Gradient vector flow: A new external force for snakes," Proceedings of IEEE Computer Society conference on Computer Vision and Pattern Recognition. IEEE, 1997.
