= Alpha-gal =

Alpha-gal may refer to:

- Alpha-galactosidase, an enzyme
- Galactose-alpha-1,3-galactose, a carbohydrate also known as Galili antigen
- Alpha-gal syndrome, acquired allergy following tick bites
