= Triadin =

Protein-coding gene in humans

TRDN

Identifiers
- Aliases: TRDN, CPVT5, TDN, TRISK, triadin, CARDAR
- External IDs: OMIM: 603283; MGI: 1924007; GeneCards: TRDN

Gene location (Human)
Chr.	Chromosome 6 (human)
Band	6q22.31	Start	123,216,339 bp
Band	6q22.31	End	123,637,093 bp

Gene location (Mouse)
Chr.	Chromosome 10 (mouse)
Band	10|10 A4	Start	32,956,550 bp
Band	10|10 A4	End	33,352,705 bp
RNA expression pattern
Bgee	Human / Mouse (ortholog); Top expressed in: Skeletal muscle tissue of rectus abdominis; biceps brachii; gastrocnemius muscle; Skeletal muscle tissue of biceps brachii; muscle of thigh; vastus lateralis muscle; glutes; apex of heart; body of tongue; triceps brachii muscle / Top expressed in: ankle; triceps brachii muscle; muscle of thigh; extraocular muscle; temporal muscle; sternocleidomastoid muscle; interventricular septum; vastus lateralis muscle; tibialis anterior muscle; digastric muscle; More reference expression data
BioGPS	n/a
Gene ontology
Molecular function	protein-macromolecule adaptor activity; protein binding; signaling receptor binding; transmembrane transporter binding
Cellular component	voltage-gated calcium channel complex; integral component of membrane; membrane; junctional sarcoplasmic reticulum membrane; sarcoplasmic reticulum; endoplasmic reticulum; sarcoplasmic reticulum membrane; junctional membrane complex; sarcoplasmic reticulum lumen; cytosol; plasma membrane
Biological process	positive regulation of cell communication by electrical coupling involved in cardiac conduction; regulation of cardiac conduction; muscle contraction; release of sequestered calcium ion into cytosol by sarcoplasmic reticulum; regulation of release of sequestered calcium ion into cytosol; cellular calcium ion homeostasis; endoplasmic reticulum membrane organization; negative regulation of ryanodine-sensitive calcium-release channel activity; positive regulation of ryanodine-sensitive calcium-release channel activity; ion transmembrane transport; cytoplasmic microtubule organization; regulation of cell communication by electrical coupling; heart contraction; regulation of cardiac muscle cell membrane potential; regulation of release of sequestered calcium ion into cytosol by sarcoplasmic reticulum; response to bacterium
Sources:Amigo / QuickGO
Orthologs
Databases	NCBI: entry; OMA: entry
Species	Human	Mouse
Entrez	10345	76757
Ensembl	ENSG00000186439	ENSMUSG00000019787
UniProt	Q13061	E9Q9K5
RefSeq (mRNA)	NM_001251987; NM_001256020; NM_001256021; NM_001256022; NM_006073	NM_029726; NM_001364696; NM_001364697
RefSeq (protein)	NP_001238916; NP_001242949; NP_001242950; NP_001242951; NP_006064 NP_001242950.1	NP_084002; NP_001351625; NP_001351626
Location (UCSC)	Chr 6: 123.22 – 123.64 Mb	Chr 10: 32.96 – 33.35 Mb
PubMed search
- Wikidata
View/Edit Human	View/Edit Mouse

Triadin, also known as TRDN, is a human gene associated with the release of calcium ions from the sarcoplasmic reticulum triggering muscular contraction through calcium-induced calcium release. Triadin is a multiprotein family, arising from different processing of the TRDN gene on chromosome 6. It is a transmembrane protein on the sarcoplasmic reticulum due to a well defined hydrophobic section and it forms a quaternary complex with the cardiac ryanodine receptor (RYR2), calsequestrin (CASQ2) and junctin proteins. The luminal (inner compartment of the sarcoplasmic reticulum) section of Triadin has areas of highly charged amino acid residues that act as luminal Ca^{2+} receptors. Triadin is also able to sense luminal Ca^{2+} concentrations by mediating interactions between RYR2 and CASQ2. Triadin has several different forms; Trisk 95 and Trisk 51, which are expressed in skeletal muscle, and Trisk 32 (CT1), which is mainly expressed in cardiac muscle.

== Interactions ==
TRDN has been shown to interact with RYR1.

Triadin is required to physically link the RYR2 and CASQ2 proteins, so that RYR2 channel activity can be regulated by CASQ2. The linkage of RYR2 with CASQ2 occurs via highly charged luminal sections of Triadin that are characterized as alternating positively and negatively charged amino acids, known as the KEKE motif.

Luminal concentration levels of Ca^{2+} are sensed by CSQ, and this information is transmitted to RyR via Triadin. At low luminal Ca^{2+} concentrations, Triadin is bound to both RYR2 and CASQ2, so that CSQ prevents RYR2 from opening. At high luminal Ca^{2+} concentrations, Ca^{2+} binding sites on CASQ2 become occupied with Ca^{2+}, leading to a weakened interaction between CASQ2 and Triadin. This removes CASQ2's ability to have an inhibitory effect on the RYR2 channel activity. As more Ca^{2+} binding sites on CASQ2 become occupied, there is an increasing probability of the RYR2 channel being able to open. Eventually, CASQ2 completely dissociates from Triadin and the RYR2 channel becomes completely uninhibited, although Triadin remains bound to RYR2 at all luminal concentrations of Ca^{2+}.

== Relation to catecholaminergic polymorphic ventricular tachycardia ==
Most mutations that result in CPVT are found in RYR2 or CASQ2 genes, however a third of CPVT patients have no mutations in either of these proteins, making a mutation in Triadin the most likely cause Because Triadin is necessary in the regulation of Ca^{2+} release by the RyR channel during cardiac contraction, a mutation that prevents Triadin from being formed will make CASQ2 unable to inhibit the RYR2 channel activity, allowing Ca^{2+} leaks and the development of CPVT.

A deletion of amino acids in the TRDN gene can result in an early stop codon. A premature stop codon can either prevent the gene from being translated into the Triadin protein, or can result in a shortened, nonfunctional Triadin protein. A replacement of the amino acid Arginine for the amino acid Threonine at position 59 of the TRDN gene (pT59R) causes instability of Triadin, leading to degradation of the protein. Any of these naturally occurring mutations result in an absence of functional Triadin protein, resulting in CPVT in patients.
