= Ryanodine receptor =

Class of intracellular transport proteins

Ryanodine receptors (RyR) are classified as high-conductance, intracellular calcium release channels, typically present in the membrane of the sarcoplasmic and endoplasmic reticulum. The major role these channels play is to regulate cell signaling and muscle contraction by releasing calcium ions. There are three major isoforms of the ryanodine receptor (RyR1, RyR2, and RyR3), which are found in different tissues and participate in various signaling pathways involving calcium release from intracellular organelles. RyR1 is responsible for skeletal muscle contraction, RyR2 is responsible for cardiac muscle contraction, and RyR3 is responsible for maintaining calcium homeostasis in the brain and throughout other tissues in the body.

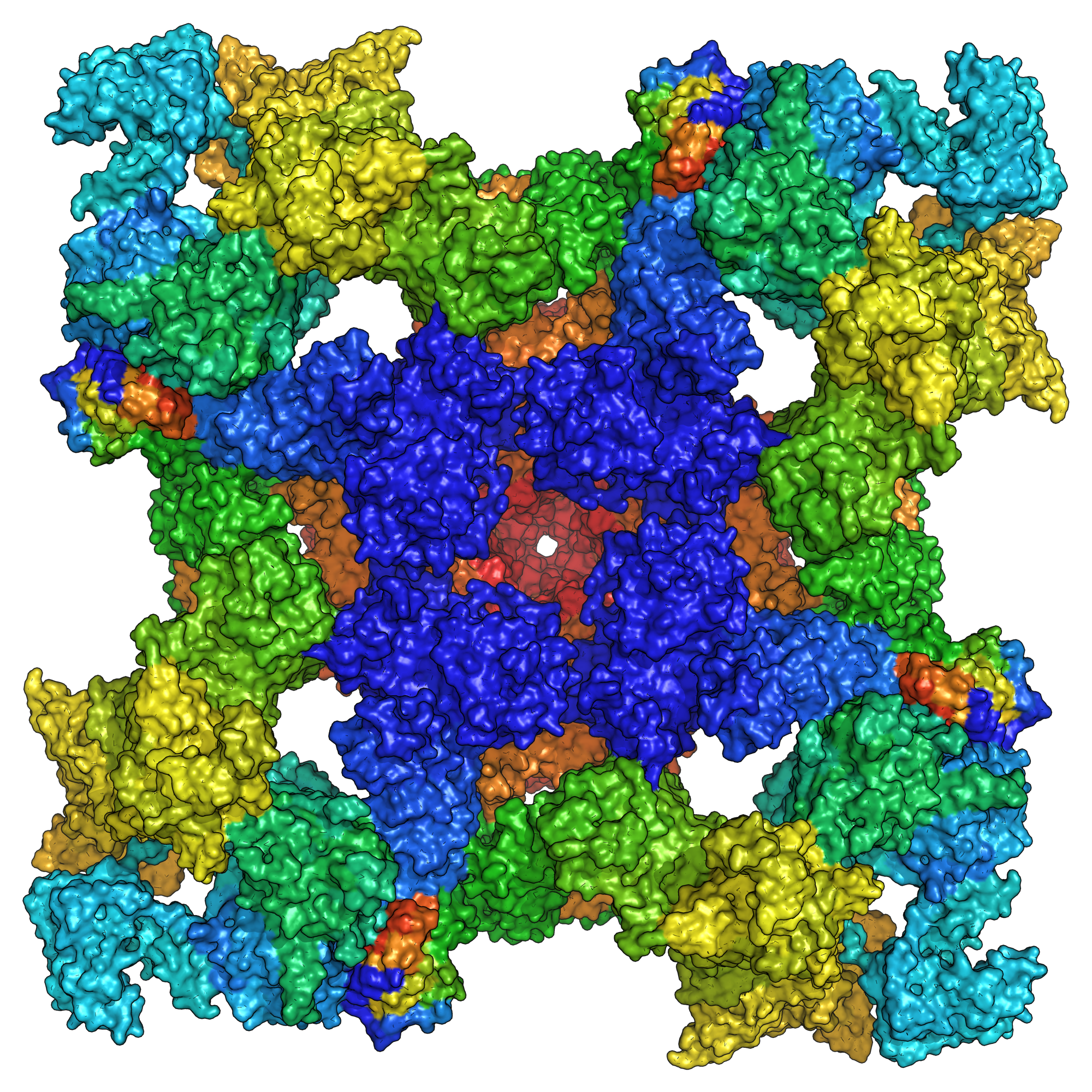
Cytoplasmic face of phosphorylated RyR2 in open conformation. PDB: 7U9R

== Discovery ==
The ryanodine receptors were originally identified in the 1980s and named after the plant alkaloid ryanodine, found in Central and South America. When ryanodine was first found it was investigated to be a potential insecticide due to its ability to induce paralysis amongst insects.

Later research saw that ryanodine had a high binding affinity to the sarcoplasmic reticulum in muscle cells, which allowed researchers to turn ryanodine into a high affinity ligand responsible for finding its purified receptor. The purified receptor turned out to be a calcium release channel, responsible for controlling the movement of calcium from stores in the cardiac and skeletal tissue.

Ryanodine

== Structure ==
Ryanodine receptors are known as one of the largest ion channels that form multidomain homotetramers. These domains regulate intracellular calcium ions to release from the sarcoplasmic and endoplasmic reticula. These receptors have weights exceeding 2 megadaltons and their structural complexity enables a wide variety of allosteric regulation mechanisms. Due to these receptors size and structure they are able to integrate regulatory signals and readily control the rate of calcium release.

Studies involving cryo-electron microscopy (cryo-EM) have revealed 3-D structures of Ryanodine receptors. It has been shown that RyR's have fourfold symmetry and adopt a mushroom-like structure: a large cytosolic assembly that forms the "cap" and smaller transmembrane regions that form the "stalk", which is embedded into the sarco/endoplasmatic reticulum's membrane. The bulk of the receptors, approximately 80% of the mass, are present in the cytosolic domain, which accounts for the many regulatory interactions. The cytosolic portion of the structure is made up of an extended α-solenoid scaffold which is able to connect regulatory domains to the ion conducting pores found in the transmembrane region. This allows the receptor to gather and read diverse signal inputs. Also, due to the transmembrane region containing ion conducting pores that puts RyR's in the six-transmembrane ion channel superfamily. Additionally, there is a unique domain inserted between the second and third transmembrane helices which interacts intimately with paired EF-hands originating from the α-solenoid scaffold, suggesting a mechanism for channel gating by Ca^{2+}.

Each major ryanodine receptor isoform (RyR1, RyR2, and RyR3) share a similar structure with minor differences that depend on where they are located and how they function, i.e. heart or skeletal muscle.

== Isoforms ==
There are multiple isoforms of ryanodine receptors:

- RyR1 is primarily expressed in skeletal muscle
  - It is essential for excitation-contraction coupling
- RyR2 is primarily expressed in myocardium (heart muscle)
  - the major cellular mediator of calcium-induced calcium release (CICR) in animal cells.
- RyR3 is expressed more widely, but especially in the brain.
  - It is involved in neuroprotection, memory, pain modulation, and social behavior.

Non-mammalian vertebrates typically express two RyR isoforms, referred to as RyR-alpha and RyR-beta. Many invertebrates, including the model organisms Drosophila melanogaster (fruitfly) and Caenorhabditis elegans, only have a single isoform. In non-metazoan species, calcium-release channels with sequence homology to RyRs can be found, but they are shorter than the mammalian ones and may be closer to inositol trisphosphate (IP_{3}) receptors.

ryanodine receptor 1 (skeletal)

Identifiers
- Symbol: RYR1
- Alt. symbols: MHS, MHS1, CCO
- NCBI gene: 6261
- HGNC: 10483
- OMIM: 180901
- RefSeq: NM_000540
- UniProt: P21817

Other data
- Locus: Chr. 19 q13.1
Search for
- Structures: Swiss-model
- Domains: InterPro

ryanodine receptor 2 (cardiac)

Identifiers
- Symbol: RYR2
- NCBI gene: 6262
- HGNC: 10484
- OMIM: 180902
- RefSeq: NM_001035
- UniProt: Q92736

Other data
- Locus: Chr. 1 q42.1-q43
Search for
- Structures: Swiss-model
- Domains: InterPro

ryanodine receptor 3

Identifiers
- Symbol: RYR3
- NCBI gene: 6263
- HGNC: 10485
- OMIM: 180903
- RefSeq: NM_001036
- UniProt: Q15413

Other data
- Locus: Chr. 15 q14-q15
Search for
- Structures: Swiss-model
- Domains: InterPro

== Physiology ==
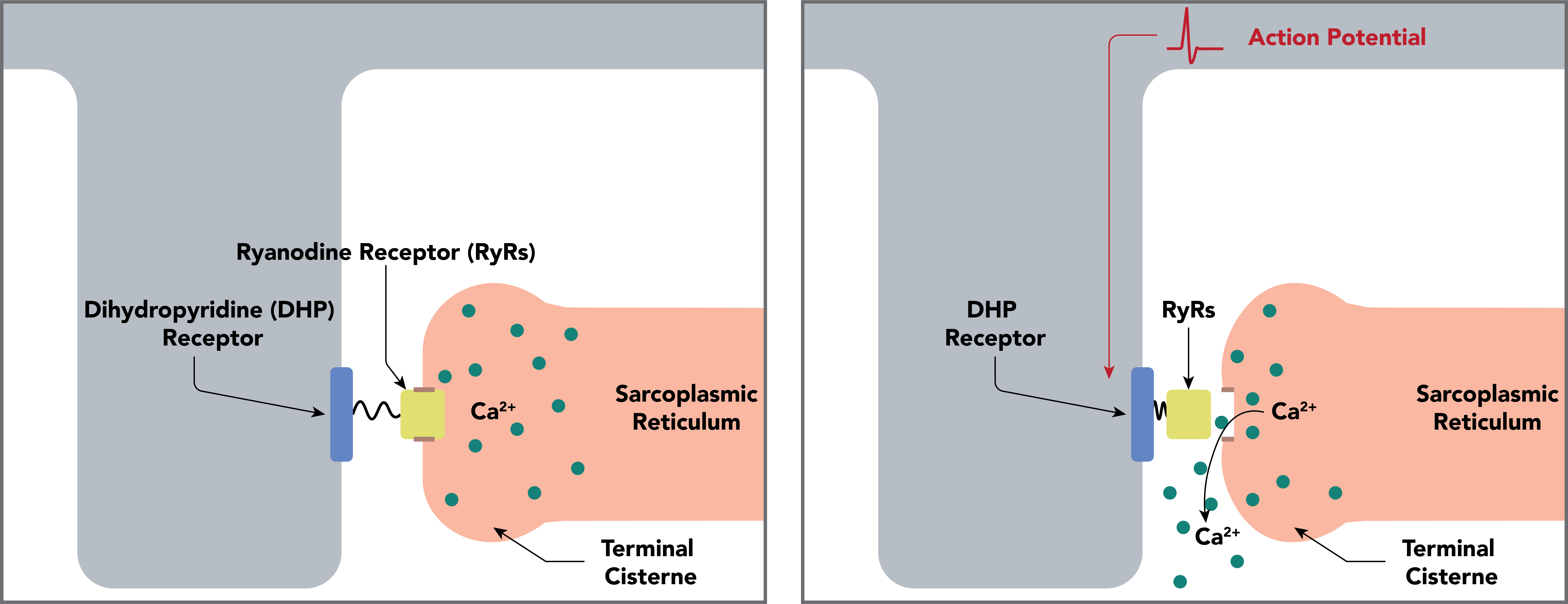

Ryanodine receptors mediate the release of calcium ions from the sarcoplasmic reticulum and endoplasmic reticulum, an essential step in muscle contraction. In skeletal muscle, activation of ryanodine receptors occurs via a physical coupling to the dihydropyridine receptor (a voltage-dependent, L-type calcium channel), whereas in cardiac muscle, the primary mechanism of activation is calcium-induced calcium release, which causes calcium outflow from the sarcoplasmic reticulum.

It has been shown that calcium release from a number of ryanodine receptors in a RyR cluster results in a spatiotemporally-restricted rise in cytosolic calcium that can be visualized as a calcium spark. Calcium release from RyR has been shown to regulate ATP production in heart and pancreas cells.

Ryanodine receptors are similar to the inositol trisphosphate (IP_{3} or InsP_{3}) receptor, and stimulated to transport Ca^{2+} into the cytosol by recognizing Ca^{2+} on its cytosolic side, thus establishing a positive feedback mechanism; a small amount of Ca^{2+} in the cytosol near the receptor will cause it to release even more Ca^{2+} (calcium-induced calcium release/CICR). However, as the concentration of intracellular Ca^{2+} rises, this can trigger closing of RyR, preventing the total depletion of SR. This finding indicates that a plot of opening probability for RyR as a function of Ca^{2+} concentration is a bell-curve. Furthermore, RyR can sense the Ca^{2+} concentration inside the ER/SR and spontaneously open in a process known as store overload-induced calcium release (SOICR).

RyRs are especially important in neurons and muscle cells. In heart and pancreas cells, another second messenger (cyclic ADP-ribose) takes part in the receptor activation.

The localized and time-limited activity of Ca^{2+} in the cytosol is also called a Ca^{2+} wave. The propagation of the wave is accomplished by the feedback mechanism of the ryanodine receptor. The activation of phospholipase C by GPCR or RTK triggers the production of inositol trisphosphate, which activates of the InsP_{3} receptor.

== Pharmacology ==
Ryanodine receptors are ligand-gated calcium channels, which are highly sensitive to modulation by endogenous ions, small molecules, pharmacological agents. The receptors located along the sarcoplasmic reticulum, are responsible for storing calcium. When calcium is triggered to be released, via action potentials down the cell membrane, contractile proteins are activated, this is essential for excitation-contraction coupling of striated muscle. Mutations in these proteins can cause RyR related myopathies ranging from mild to extreme including: muscle weakness, respiratory failure, cardiac arrest, sudden infant death syndrome (SIDS), exertional rhabdomyolysis (ER), central core disease (CCD), multiminicore disease (MmD), catecholaminergic polymorphic ventricular tachycardia (CPVT), and/or malignant hyperthermia (MH). Some of these disorders related to RyR mutations have high mortality rates so having pharmacological agents to treat these disorders or reverse these mutations would be a great step in future medicine.

The plant alkaloid ryanodine, for which this receptor was named, has become an invaluable investigative tool. It can block the phasic release of calcium, but at low doses may not block the tonic cumulative calcium release. The binding of ryanodine to RyRs is use-dependent, that is the channels have to be in the activated state. At low (<10 micromolar, works even at nanomolar) concentrations, ryanodine binding locks the RyRs into a long-lived subconductance (half-open) state and eventually depletes the store, while higher (~100 micromolar) concentrations irreversibly inhibit channel-opening.

- Activators:
  - Direct Agonist: 4-chloro-m-cresol (4CmC)
    - Induces calcium release from ryanodine receptors and is used to investigate physiological and molecular functions in tissue, cells, and membranes. 4CmC has also shown potential for being a diagnostic tool to recognize muscles that are susceptible to MH.
    - It's proven to be a better activator compared to caffeine, only needing approximately 1 mM to induce the release of calcium vs caffeine's 5-10 mM concentration.
    - RyR1 and RyR2 are most sensitive to 4CmC compared to the other isoforms.
  - Direct Agonist: Suramin
    - Binds to the calmodulin (CaM) binding site on the ryanodine receptor which triggers calcium release from the SR.
  - Xanthines like caffeine and pentifylline activate it by potentiating sensitivity to native ligand Ca.
  - Physiological agonist: Cyclic ADP-ribose can act as a physiological gating agent. It has been suggested that it may act by making FKBP12.6 (12.6 kilodalton FK506 binding protein, as opposed to 12 kDa FKBP12 which binds to RyR1) which normally bind (and blocks) RyR2 channel tetramer in an average stoichiometry of 3.6, to fall off RyR2 (which is the predominant RyR in pancreatic beta cells, cardiomyocytes and smooth muscles).
- Antagonists:
  - Ryanodine
    - High concentration ryanodine (micromolar, > 10 ℳM), completely closes the RyR channels.
    - Low concentration ryanodine (nanomolar, < 10 ℳM), locks the RyR channels at a half-open state.
  - Dantrolene
    - Clinically used antagonist FDA approved to treat malignant hyperthermia (MH) and spasticity.
    - Specifically targets RyR1 and RyR3.
  - Azumolene
    - Analog of Dantrolene, used to relax skeletal muscle by inhibiting the release of calcium from the SR.
  - Ruthenium red
    - Experimental antagonist that binds to the channel pore and blocks RyR1 medicated calcium release.
  - Procaine, tetracaine, etc. (local anesthetics)

A variety of other molecules may interact with and regulate ryanodine receptor. For example: dimerized Homer physical tether linking inositol trisphosphate receptors (IP3R) and ryanodine receptors on the intracellular calcium stores with cell surface group 1 metabotropic glutamate receptors and the Alpha-1D adrenergic receptor

=== As potential drug targets ===
The expression, distribution, and gating of RyRs are modified by cellular proteins, presenting an opportunity to develop new drugs that target RyR channel complexes by manipulating these proteins. Several drugs, such as FK506, rapamycin, and K201, can modify interactions between RyRs and their accessory proteins.

Drug	Target	Effect	Clinical Use	Concerns
Tacrolimus (FK506), Rapamycin	FKBP12/12.6-RyR	Increases channel opening probability, enhances calcium release	Immunosuppressant	Disrupts channel stability and causes calcium leaks
Rycals: S107 and K201 (JTV519)	FKBP12.6-RyR	Stabilizes complex, prevents leak	Heart Failure and catecholaminergic polymorphic ventricular tachycardia (CPVT)	K201: Off-target SERCA inhibition
Dantrolene	RyR1, RyR3	Skeletal Muscle Relaxant	malignant hyperthermia (MH), spasticity	No effect on RyR2
Doxorubicin, Tricyclic antidepressants	RyR2, CASQ2	Reduces Ca²⁺ buffering	Chemotherapy, antidepressants	Cardiotoxicity
Flecainide	Nav1.5 Channels, secondary effects on RyR2	Slows cardiac conduction velocity	Atrial fibrillation, paroxysmal supraventricular tachycardias (PSVT), catecholaminergic polymorphic ventricular tachycardia (CPVT)	Proarrhythmia
Statins	HMG-CoA Reductase, RyR1	Abnormally opens RyR1	Hypercholesterolemia	Adverse skeletal muscle effects, toxic calcium leakage

== Associated proteins ==
RyRs form docking platforms for a multitude of proteins and small molecule ligands. Accessory proteins bind these channels and regulate their gating, localization, expression, and integration with cellular signaling in a tissue- and isoform-specific manner.

FK506-Binding Proteins (FKBP12 / FKBP12.6) — aka Calstabin-1 and Calstabin-2 — stabilize the closed state of RyRs, preventing pathological Ca²⁺ leak.

The cardiac-specific isoform (RyR2) is known to form a quaternary complex with luminal calsequestrin, junctin, and triadin. Calsequestrin (CASQ) has multiple Ca^{2+} binding sites that bind with very low affinity, allowing easy ion release. It acts as RyR gate modulators by signaling when Ca^{2+} stores are full. Triadin and Junctin are sarcoplasmic reticulum (SR) membrane proteins that link RyRs to CASQ and also respond to Ca²⁺ store levels.

Calmodulin (CaM) and S100A1 both bind the same site on RyRs (especially RyR1 and RyR2), but exert opposite effects: Ca²⁺-bound CaM inhibits RyRs while S100A1 enhances its opening. Expression levels and competition between these proteins tune RyR responses to Ca²⁺ signals.

== Role in disease ==
RyR1 mutations are associated with malignant hyperthermia and central core disease. Mutant-type RyR1 receptors exposed to volatile anesthetics or other triggering agents can display an increased affinity for cytoplasmic Ca^{2+} at activating sites as well as a decreased cytoplasmic Ca^{2+} affinity at inhibitory sites. The breakdown of this feedback mechanism causes uncontrolled release of Ca^{2+} into the cytoplasm, and increased ATP hydrolysis resulting from ATPase enzymes shuttling Ca^{2+} back into the sarcoplasmic reticulum leads to excessive heat generation.

RyR2 mutations play a role in stress-induced polymorphic ventricular tachycardia (a form of cardiac arrhythmia) and ARVD. It has also been shown that levels of type RyR3 are greatly increased in PC12 cells overexpressing mutant human Presenilin 1, and in brain tissue in knockin mice that express mutant Presenilin 1 at normal levels, and thus may play a role in the pathogenesis of neurodegenerative diseases, like Alzheimer's disease.

The presence of antibodies against ryanodine receptors in blood serum has also been associated with myasthenia gravis (i.e., MG). Individuals with MG who have antibodies directed against ryanodine receptors typically have a more severe form of generalized MG in which their skeletal muscle weaknesses involve muscles that govern basic life functions.

Sudden cardiac death in several young individuals in the Amish community (four of which were from the same family) was traced to homozygous duplication of a mutant RyR2 (Ryanodine Receptor) gene. Normal (wild type) ryanodine receptors are involved in CICR in heart and other muscles, and RyR2 functions primarily in the myocardium (heart muscle).

== See also ==
- Diamide, a class of insecticide that act through ryanodine receptors
  - The diamides, an important class of insecticide making up 13% of the insecticide market, work by activating insect RyRs.
- Neuromuscular junction
- Dihydropyridine receptor
