= Peter Wilmshurst =

British medical doctor and whistleblower

Peter Wilmshurst is a British medical doctor and successful whistleblower who has been the subject of multiple cases of harassment through vexatious libel actions brought by companies whose products he criticised as ineffective. He has also reported at least twenty doctors to the General Medical Council in the course of two decades of investigating research misconduct.

== Background ==
=== Sterling-Winthrop case ===
In 1986, Wilmshurst, a cardiologist then working at St. Thomas' Hospital, London, approached The Guardian newspaper with a substantial dossier detailing alleged misconduct in the development of amrinone, a cardiac drug manufactured by Sterling-Winthrop. The drug was supported by a study at Harvard Medical School and published in the New England Journal of Medicine, whose lead author was Eugene Braunwald. Wilmshurst's group ran a series of experiments on the drug but found no effect on contractility and frequent life-threatening side effects. Wilmshurst reported these findings to Sterling-Winthrop, who asked him to suppress the data. He refused, and they retaliated by threatening litigation. He published his findings, and then contacted the UK's Committee on Safety of Medicines (CSM) and discovered that Sterling-Winthrop had also failed to report the adverse events to the UK; they had also threatened the UK Government with closure of a large manufacturing plant in the UK. Sterling-Winthrop subsequently reported over 1,400 adverse events to the US Federal Food and Drug Administration and terminated research and marketing in the USA. Finally, after a substantial Guardian feature, they withdrew the oral drug entirely in 1986. In 2003, Wilmshurst received the Health Watch Award.

=== Banerjee-Peters Case ===
In the late 1990s, Wilmshurst reported concerns about fabricated research by Dr Anjan K. Banerjee and his supervisor Professor Tim J. Peters at King’s College London, which led to a General Medical Council tribunal in 2000 finding both guilty of serious professional misconduct for falsifying a 1990 paper in Gut. Tim Peters was reprimanded for failing to prevent further falsification and not ensuring timely retraction of the work.

=== NMT Medical case ===
In 2000, Wilmshurst published a paper linking migraine to patent foramen ovale, a common cardiac condition affecting up to one in four people. This led NMT Medical to develop a PFO closure device branded STARflex. Wilmshurst was recruited as part of the "Migraine Intervention with STARflex Technology" (MIST) trial. A substantial discrepancy emerged between interpretations of echocardiogram results by the implanting cardiologists and Wilmshurst's review. Wilmshurst reported a significantly higher proportion with residual cardiac shunts. An independent review backed Wilmshurst's figures, and he presented on and gave interviews about his findings. NMT filed a libel suit in 2007, and drew media attention. NMT brought more suits against Wilmshurst, but declared bankruptcy three years in, ending the legal proceedings.

=== Bawa-Garba Case ===
In light of the Hadiza Bawa-Garba case, Wilmshurst referred himself to the GMC and asked the regulatory body to both remove himself from the register and scrutinise his medical practice. This is because of concerns felt by British medical practitioners with the GMC's outcome and appeal (successfully won) against Bawa-Garba. Multiple parties have been concerned about the outcome of this hearing, as well as the repercussions on current medical practice.

== Libel reform ==
Wilmshurst's experience, along with British Chiropractic Association v Singh, have been cited as catalysts for the UK's libel reform campaign, leading to the Defamation Act 2013.
