= Calcium buffering =

Cellular process

Calcium buffering describes the processes which help stabilise the concentration of free calcium ions within cells, in a similar manner to how pH buffers maintain a stable concentration of hydrogen ions. The majority of calcium ions within the cell are bound to intracellular proteins, leaving a minority freely dissociated. When calcium is added to or removed from the cytoplasm by transport across the cell membrane or sarcoplasmic reticulum, calcium buffers minimise the effect on changes in cytoplasmic free calcium concentration by binding calcium to or releasing calcium from intracellular proteins. As a result, 99% of the calcium added to the cytosol of a cardiomyocyte during each cardiac cycle becomes bound to calcium buffers, creating a relatively small change in free calcium.

The regulation of free calcium is of particular importance in excitable cells like cardiomyocytes and neurons. Within these cells, many intracellular proteins can act as calcium buffers. In cardiac muscle cells, the most important buffers within the cytoplasm include troponin C, SERCA, calmodulin, and myosin, while the most important within calcium buffer within the sarcoplasmic reticulum is calsequestrin., The effects of calcium buffers depends on their affinity for calcium, as well as the speed with which they bind and release it.

== Clinical significance ==
Alterations in calcium buffering within the cytosol have been implicated in the tendency to arrhythmias (abnormal cardiac rhythms) in some genetic mutations known to cause hypertrophic cardiomyopathy. Genetic mutations affecting calsequestrin are responsible for an autosomal recessive form of catecholaminergic polymorphic ventricular tachycardia, an inherited cardiac condition that can lead to sudden death. Calcium buffering within atrial myocytes is affected by ageing in large animal models, elevating sarcoplasmic reticulum calcium content, which could potentially contribute towards a tendency to atrial fibrillation.

== See also ==
- Calcium channel
- Cellular communication (biology)
- Excitation contraction coupling
- Protein dynamics
