= TECR =

Protein-coding gene in the species Homo sapiens

Identifiers
- Aliases: TECR, GPSN2, MRT14, SC2, TER, trans-2,3-enoyl-CoA reductase
- External IDs: OMIM: 610057; MGI: 1915408; GeneCards: TECR
Available structures
PDB	Ortholog search: PDBe RCSB
PDB	List of PDB id codes 2DZJ
Enzyme activity
EC #	BRENDA	ExPASy	KEGG	MetaCyc
1.3.1.93	↗	↗	↗	↗

Gene location (Human)
Chr.	Chromosome 19 (human)
Band	19p13.12	Start	14,517,085 bp
Band	19p13.12	End	14,565,980 bp

Gene location (Mouse)
Chr.	Chromosome 8 (mouse)
Band	8 C2|8 40.22 cM	Start	84,298,327 bp
Band	8 C2|8 40.22 cM	End	84,334,600 bp
RNA expression pattern
Bgee	Human / Mouse (ortholog); Top expressed in: right hemisphere of cerebellum; left testis; right testis; skin of abdomen; skin of leg; C1 segment; minor salivary glands; muscle of thigh; right adrenal cortex; right frontal lobe / Top expressed in: central gray substance of midbrain; cerebellar cortex; cerebellar vermis; dorsal tegmental nucleus; ventromedial nucleus; medial vestibular nucleus; primary visual cortex; supraoptic nucleus; lobe of cerebellum; pontine nuclei; More reference expression data
BioGPS	n/a
Gene ontology
Molecular function	oxidoreductase activity, acting on the CH-CH group of donors; protein binding; very-long-chain-acyl-CoA dehydrogenase activity; oxidoreductase activity; very-long-chain enoyl-CoA reductase activity
Cellular component	cytoplasm; integral component of membrane; integral component of endoplasmic reticulum membrane; endoplasmic reticulum membrane; endoplasmic reticulum; nucleus; membrane
Biological process	fatty acid elongation; fatty acid biosynthetic process; long-chain fatty-acyl-CoA biosynthetic process; very long-chain fatty acid biosynthetic process; fatty acid metabolic process; lipid metabolism; sphingolipid metabolic process
Sources:Amigo / QuickGO
Orthologs
Databases	NCBI: entry; OMA: entry
Species	Human	Mouse
Entrez	9524	106529
Ensembl	ENSG00000099797	ENSMUSG00000031708
UniProt	Q9NZ01	Q9CY27
RefSeq (mRNA)	NM_004868; NM_138501; NM_001321170	NM_027179; NM_134118
RefSeq (protein)	NP_001308099; NP_612510	NP_081455; NP_598879
Location (UCSC)	Chr 19: 14.52 – 14.57 Mb	Chr 8: 84.3 – 84.33 Mb
PubMed search
- Wikidata
View/Edit Human	View/Edit Mouse

Trans-2,3-enoyl-CoA reductase is an enzyme that in humans is encoded by the TECR gene.

The TECR gene encodes a multi-pass membrane protein that resides in the endoplasmic reticulum, and belongs to the steroid 5-alpha reductase family. The elongation of microsomal long chain fatty acids and very long chain fatty acids consists of 4 sequential reactions. This protein catalyzes the final step, reducing trans-2,3-enoyl-CoA to saturated acyl-CoA. Alternatively spliced transcript variants have been found for this gene.

== Clinical relevance ==
Mutations in this gene have been shown to cause non-syndromic intellectual disability.
