= Calcium sparks =

Higher release of Calcium in cells

A calcium spark is the microscopic release of calcium (Ca^{2+}) from a store known as the sarcoplasmic reticulum (SR), located within muscle cells. This release occurs through an ion channel within the membrane of the SR, known as a ryanodine receptor (RyR), which opens upon activation. This process is important as it helps to maintain Ca^{2+} concentration within the cell. It also initiates muscle contraction in skeletal and cardiac muscles and muscle relaxation in smooth muscles. Ca^{2+} sparks are important in physiology as they show how Ca^{2+} can be used at a subcellular level, to signal both local changes, known as local control, as well as whole cell changes.

== Activation ==
As mentioned above, Ca^{2+} sparks depend on the opening of ryanodine receptors, of which there are three types:

- Type 1 – found mainly in skeletal muscle
- Type 2 – found mainly in the heart
- Type 3 – found in smooth muscle and neurones

Opening of the channel allows Ca^{2+} to pass from the SR, into the cell. This increases the local Ca^{2+} concentration around the RyR, by a factor of 10. Calcium sparks can either be evoked or spontaneous, as described below.

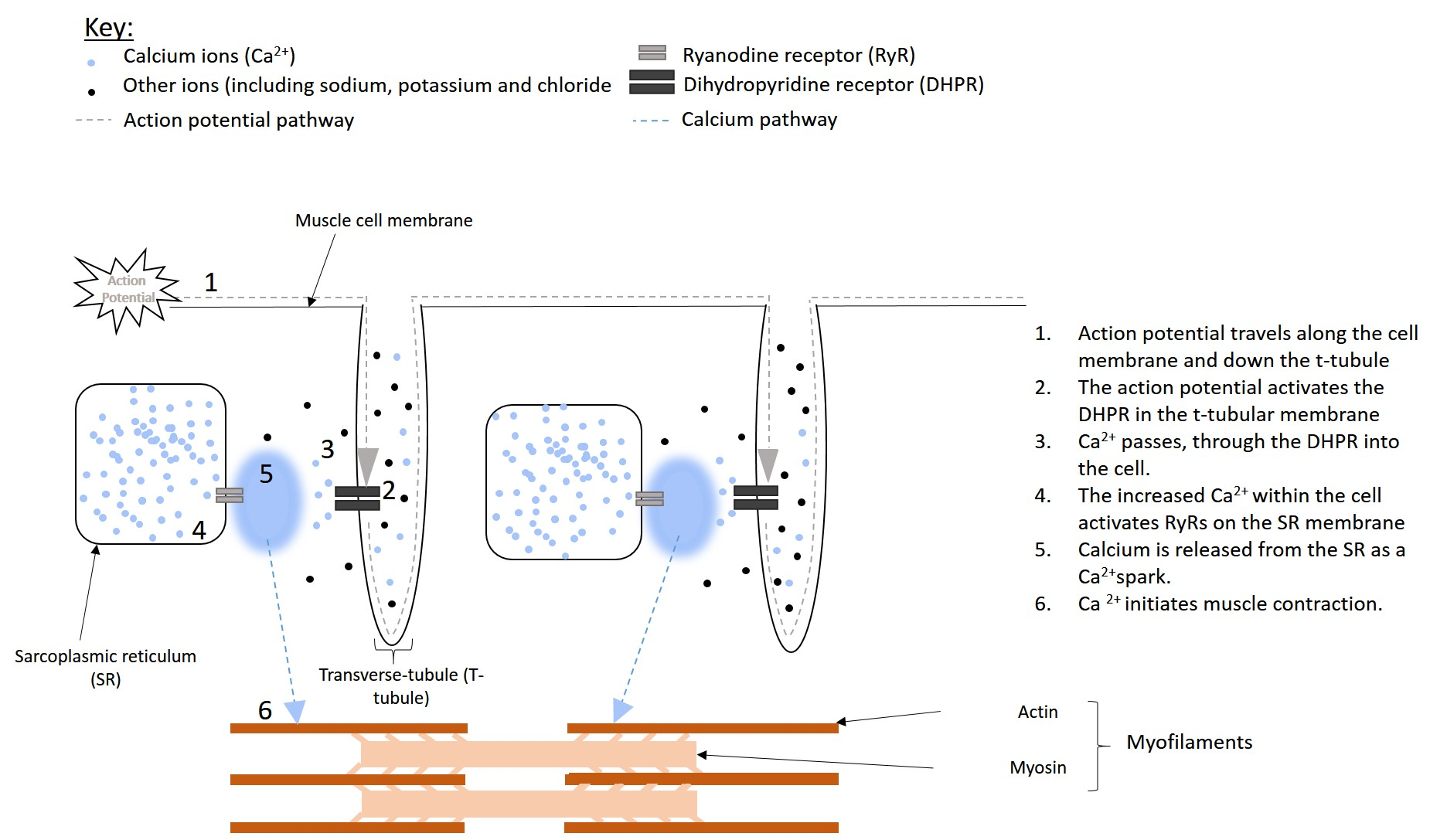
Figure 1: An evoked calcium spark, in a cardiac muscle cell.

=== Evoked ===
Electrical impulses, known as action potentials, travel along the cell membrane (sarcolemma) of muscle cells. Located in the sarcolemma of smooth muscle cells are receptors, called dihydropyridine receptors (DHPR). In skeletal and cardiac muscle cells, however, these receptors are located within structures known as T-tubules, that are extensions of the plasma membrane penetrating deep into the cell (see figure 1). These DHPRs are located directly opposite to the ryanodine receptors, located on the sarcoplasmic reticulum and activation, by the action potential causes the DHPRs to change shape.

In cardiac and smooth muscle, activation of the DHPR results in it forming an ion channel. This allows Ca^{2+} to pass into the cell, increasing the local Ca^{2+} concentration, around the RyR. When four Ca^{2+} molecules bind to the RyR, it opens, resulting in a larger release of Ca^{2+}, from the SR . This process, of using Ca^{2+} to activate release of Ca^{2+} from the SR is known as calcium-induced calcium release (CICR).

However, in skeletal muscle the DHPR touches the RyR. Therefore, the shape change of the DHPR activates the RyR directly, without the need for Ca^{2+} to flood into the cell first. This causes the RyR to open, allowing Ca^{2+} to be released from the SR.

=== Spontaneous ===
Ca^{2+} sparks can also occur in cells at rest (i.e. cells that have not been stimulated by an action potential). This occurs roughly 100 times every second in each cell and is a result of the resting Ca^{2+} concentration being high enough to start local CICR. An increase in Ca^{2+} within the SR is also thought to bind to Ca^{2+} sensitive sites on the inside of the RyR causing the channel to be more likely to open. As well as this, a protein called calsequestrin (found within the SR) detaches from the RyR, when calcium concentration is high, again allowing the channel to open (see sarcoplasmic reticulum for more details). Similarly, a decrease in Ca^{2+} concentration within the SR has also proven to lower RyR sensitivity. This is thought to be due to the calsequestrin binding more strongly to the RyR, preventing it from opening and decreasing the likelihood of a spontaneous spark.

== Calcium after release ==
There are roughly 10,000 clusters of ryanodine receptors within a single cardiac cell, with each cluster containing around 100 ryanodine receptors. During a single spontaneous spark, when Ca^{2+} is released from the SR, the Ca^{2+} diffuses throughout the cell. As the RyRs in the heart are activated by Ca^{2+}, the movement of the Ca^{2+} released during a spontaneous spark, can activate the neighbouring RyRs within the same cluster. However, there usually isn't enough Ca^{2+} present in a single spark to reach a neighbouring cluster of receptors. The calcium can, however, signal back to the DHPR causing it to close and preventing further influx of calcium as a form of negative feedback for long term stability.

An increase in Ca^{2+} concentration within the cell or the production of a larger spark, can lead to a large enough calcium released that the neighbouring cluster can be activated by the first. This is known as spark-induced spark activation and can lead to a Ca^{2+} wave of calcium release spreading across the cell.

During evoked Ca^{2+} sparks, all clusters of ryanodine receptors, throughout the cell are activated at almost exactly the same time. This produces an increase in Ca^{2+} concentration across the whole cell (not just locally) and is known as a whole cell Ca^{2+} transient. This Ca^{2+} then binds to a protein, called troponin, initiating contraction, through a group of proteins known as myofilaments.

In smooth muscle cells, the Ca^{2+} released during a spark is used for muscle relaxation. This is because, the Ca^{2+} that enters the cell via the DHPR in response to the action potential, stimulates both muscle contraction and calcium release from the SR. The Ca^{2+} released during the spark, then activates two other ion channels on the membrane. One channel allows potassium ions to exit the cell, whereas the other allows chloride ions to leave the cell. The result of this movement of ions, is that the membrane voltage becomes more negative. This deactivates the DHPR (which was activated by the positive membrane potential produced by the action potential), causing it to close and stopping the flow of Ca^{2+}into the cell, leading to relaxation.

== Termination ==
The mechanism by which SR Ca^{2+} release terminates is still not fully understood. Current main theories are outlined below:

=== Local depletion of SR Ca^{2+} ===
This theory suggests that during a calcium spark, as calcium flows out of the SR, the concentration of Ca^{2+} within the local region of the SR becomes too low to support continued release. However, this was not thought to be the case for spontaneous sparks as the total release during a Ca^{2+} spark is small compared to total SR Ca^{2+} content and researchers have produced sparks lasting longer than 200 milliseconds, therefore showing that there is still Ca^{2+} left within the SR after a 'normal' (200ms) spark. However local depletion in the junctional SR may be much larger than previously thought (see) and this leads to the local Ca^{2+} flux being able to support local CICR. This loss of local CICR strength is the reversal of the normal activation process in CICR and effectively snowballs until the release flux is reduced to the point where only a few RyRs remain open at any one time and stochastic attrition (see below) can take place During the activation of a large number of ryanodine receptors however, as is the case during electrically evoked Ca^{2+} release, the entire SR is about 50% depleted of Ca^{2+} and this mechanism will play an important role in repriming of release.

=== Stochastic attrition ===
Despite the complicated name, this idea simply suggests that all ryanodine receptors in a cluster (and the associated dihydropyridine receptors) happen to randomly close at the same time. This would not only prevent calcium release from the SR, but it would also stop the stimulus for restarting calcium release (i.e. the flow of calcium through the DHPR). However, due to number of RyRs in a cluster, this mechanism seems unlikely to be able to start the termination of release, as there is a very small probability that they would all close together at exactly the same time.

=== Inactivation/adaptation ===
This theory suggests that after activation of the RyR and the subsequent release of Ca^{2+}, the channel closes briefly to recover. During this time, either the channel cannot be reopened, even if calcium is present (i.e. the RyR is inactivated) or the channel can be reopened, however more calcium is required to activate it than usual (i.e. the RyR is in an adaptation phase). This would mean that one-by-one the RyRs would close, thus ending the spark.

=== Sticky cluster theory ===
This theory suggests that the RyRs can comminicate their open and closed states across the cluster, perhaps via their physical conformation. Physical comminication now seems unlikely after electron micrographs showed that few RyRs actually touch each other.

== Discovery ==
Spontaneous Ca^{2+} sparks were discovered in cardiac muscle cells, of rats, in 1992 by Peace Cheng and Mark B. Cannell in Jon Lederer's laboratory at the University of Maryland, Baltimore, U.S.A.

Initially the idea was rejected by the scientific journal, Nature, who reviewers believed that the sparks were a consequence of the methodology (i.e. they were artifacts), and so wouldn't occur naturally within the body. However they were quickly recognised as being of fundamental importance to muscle physiology, playing a central role in excitation-contraction coupling.

The discovery was made possible due to improvements in confocal microscopes. This allowed for the detection of the release of Ca^{2+}, which were highlighted using a substance known as fluo-3, which caused the Ca^{2+} to be detectable by fluorescence. Ca^{2+} "sparks" were so called because of the spontaneous, localised nature of the Ca^{2+} release as well as the fact that they are the initiation event of excitation-contraction coupling.

== Detection and analysis ==
Because of the importance of Ca^{2+} sparks in explaining the gating properties of ryanodine receptors in situ (within the body), many studies have focused on improving their detectability in the hope that by accurately and reliably detecting all Ca^{2+} spark events, their properties can help us explain how muscle cell contraction is regulated.

== See also ==
- Calcium-induced calcium release
- Confocal microscopy
- Ryanodine receptor
