= Calsequestrin =

Calcium-binding protein

calsequestrin 1 (fast-twitch, skeletal muscle)
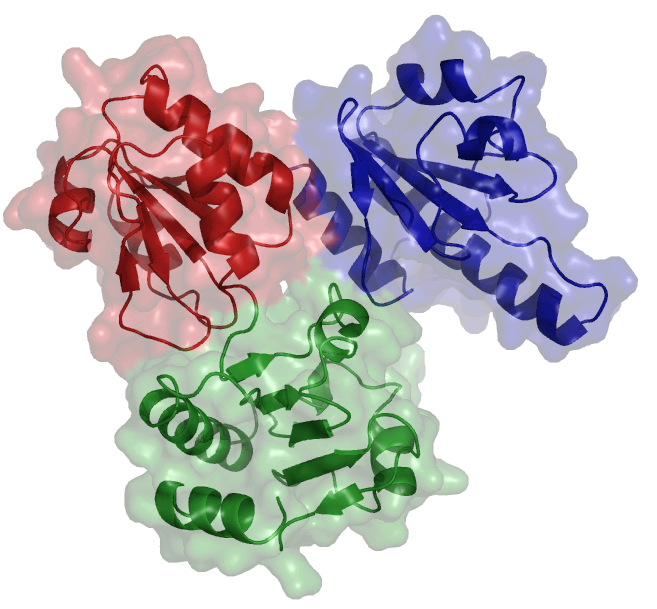
- Calsequestrin monomer showing the three repeating calsequestrin domains

Identifiers
- Symbol: CASQ1
- Alt. symbols: CASQ
- NCBI gene: 844
- HGNC: 1512
- OMIM: 114250
- PDB: 1A8Y
- RefSeq: NM_001231
- UniProt: P31415

Other data
- Locus: Chr. 1 q21
Search for
- Structures: Swiss-model
- Domains: InterPro

calsequestrin 2 (cardiac muscle)

Identifiers
- Symbol: CASQ2
- NCBI gene: 845
- HGNC: 1513
- OMIM: 114251
- RefSeq: NM_001232
- UniProt: O14958

Other data
- Locus: Chr. 1 p13.3-p11
Search for
- Structures: Swiss-model
- Domains: InterPro

Calsequestrin
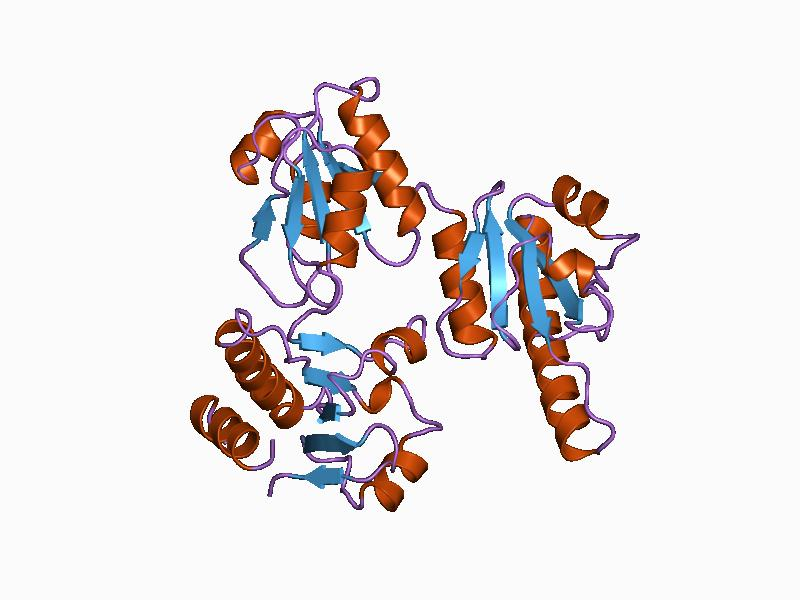
- crystal structure of calsequestrin from rabbit skeletal muscle sarcoplasmic reticulum at 2.4 a resolution

Identifiers
- Symbol: Calsequestrin
- Pfam: PF01216
- Pfam clan: CL0172
- InterPro: IPR001393
- PROSITE: PDOC00675
- SCOP2: 1a8y / SCOPe / SUPFAM
Available protein structures:
- PDB: IPR001393 PF01216 (ECOD; PDBsum)
- AlphaFold: IPR001393; PF01216

Calsequestrin is a calcium-binding protein that acts as a calcium buffer within the sarcoplasmic reticulum. The protein helps hold calcium in the cisterna of the sarcoplasmic reticulum after a muscle contraction, even though the concentration of calcium in the sarcoplasmic reticulum is much higher than in the cytosol. It also helps the sarcoplasmic reticulum store an extraordinarily high amount of calcium ions. Each molecule of calsequestrin can bind 18 to 50 Ca^{2+} ions. Sequence analysis has suggested that calcium is not bound in distinct pockets via EF-hand motifs, but rather via presentation of a charged protein surface. Two forms of calsequestrin have been identified. The cardiac form Calsequestrin-2 (CASQ2) is present in cardiac and slow skeletal muscle and the fast skeletal form Calsequestrin-1(CASQ1) is found in fast skeletal muscle. The release of calsequestrin-bound calcium (through a calcium release channel) triggers muscle contraction. The active protein is not highly structured, more than 50% of it adopting a random coil conformation. When calcium binds there is a structural change whereby the alpha-helical content of the protein increases from 3 to 11%. Both forms of calsequestrin are phosphorylated by casein kinase 2, but the cardiac form is phosphorylated more rapidly and to a higher degree. Calsequestrin is also secreted in the gut where it deprives bacteria of calcium ions.

== Cardiac calsequestrin ==
Cardiac calsequestrin (CASQ2) plays an integral role in cardiac regulation. Mutations in the cardiac calsequestrin gene have been associated with cardiac arrhythmia and sudden death. CASQ2 is thought to have a role in regulating cardiac excitation-contraction coupling and calcium-induced calcium release (CICR) in the heart, as overexpression of CASQ2 has been shown to substantially raise the magnitude of cell-averaged I_{CA}-induced calcium transients and spontaneous calcium sparks in isolated heart cells. Furthermore, CASQ2 modulates the CICR mechanism by lengthening to process to functionally recharge the sarcoplasmic reticulum's calcium ion stores. A lack of or mutation in CASQ2 has been directly associated with catecholaminergic polymorphic ventricular tachycardia (CPVT). A mutation can have a significant effect if it disrupts the linear polymerization ability of CASQ2, which directly accounts for its high-capacity to bind Ca^{2+}. In addition, the hydrophobic core of domain II appears to be necessary for CASQ2's function, because a single amino acid mutation that disrupts this hydrophobic core directly leads to molecular aggregates, which are unable to respond to calcium ions.

== Evolution ==
Calsequestrin (CASQ) exists as a single-copy gene in jawless fishes, tunicates, and branchiostomes. The duplication of CASQ1 and CASQ2 occurred in an ancestor of jawed vertebrates, and both genes appear in nearly all lineages of jawed vertebrates. Birds notably lack a functional CASQ1 gene and use CASQ2 in both skeletal and cardiac muscles, and the avian CASQ2 furthermore shows a higher proportion of negatively charged amino acids compared to other amniotes.

== See also ==
- Catecholaminergic polymorphic ventricular tachycardia
