= Ryanodine receptor 3 =

Transport protein and coding gene in humans

RYR3

Identifiers
- Aliases: RYR3, RYR-3, ryanodine receptor 3
- External IDs: OMIM: 180903; MGI: 99684; GeneCards: RYR3
Available structures
PDB	Ortholog search: PDBe RCSB
PDB	List of PDB id codes 4ERV

Gene location (Human)
Chr.	Chromosome 15 (human)
Band	15q13.3-q14	Start	33,310,962 bp
Band	15q13.3-q14	End	33,866,121 bp

Gene location (Mouse)
Chr.	Chromosome 2 (mouse)
Band	2|2 E3- E4	Start	112,461,700 bp
Band	2|2 E3- E4	End	113,047,441 bp
RNA expression pattern
Bgee	Human / Mouse (ortholog); Top expressed in: thoracic diaphragm; sural nerve; right hemisphere of cerebellum; caudate nucleus; putamen; right uterine tube; nucleus accumbens; right frontal lobe; body of uterus; gastrocnemius muscle / Top expressed in: olfactory tubercle; lateral septal nucleus; medial dorsal nucleus; subiculum; mammillary body; nucleus accumbens; motor neuron; lateral geniculate nucleus; globus pallidus; substantia nigra; More reference expression data
BioGPS	n/a
Gene ontology
Molecular function	ryanodine-sensitive calcium-release channel activity; calcium channel activity; calcium-release channel activity; calmodulin binding; ion channel activity; calcium-induced calcium release activity; calcium ion binding
Cellular component	organelle membrane; integral component of membrane; membrane; intracellular membrane-bounded organelle; sarcoplasmic reticulum; sarcoplasmic reticulum membrane; endoplasmic reticulum; perinuclear region of cytoplasm; plasma membrane; smooth endoplasmic reticulum; Z discdkac; cytoplasmic vesicle membrane; calcium channel complex; sarcolemma
Biological process	cellular response to calcium ion; cellular response to magnesium ion; regulation of cardiac conduction; cellular calcium ion homeostasis; ion transport; ion transmembrane transport; calcium ion transmembrane transport; cellular response to caffeine; cellular response to ATP; protein homotetramerization; calcium ion transport; negative regulation of cytosolic calcium ion concentration; transmembrane transport; release of sequestered calcium ion into cytosol
Sources:Amigo / QuickGO
Orthologs
Databases	NCBI: entry; OMA: entry
Species	Human	Mouse
Entrez	6263	20192
Ensembl	ENSG00000198838	ENSMUSG00000057378
UniProt	Q15413	A2AGL3
RefSeq (mRNA)	NM_001036; NM_001243996	NM_177652; NM_001319156
RefSeq (protein)	NP_001027; NP_001230925	NP_001306085
Location (UCSC)	Chr 15: 33.31 – 33.87 Mb	Chr 2: 112.46 – 113.05 Mb
PubMed search
- Wikidata
View/Edit Human	View/Edit Mouse

Ryanodine receptor 3 is one of a class of ryanodine receptors and a protein that in humans is encoded by the RYR3 gene. The protein encoded by this gene is both a calcium channel and a receptor for the plant alkaloid ryanodine. RYR3 and RYR1 control the resting calcium ion concentration in skeletal muscle.

== See also ==
- Ryanodine receptor
