= Calcium-induced calcium release =

Biological process

Calcium-induced calcium release (CICR) describes a biological process whereby calcium is able to activate calcium release from intracellular Ca^{2+} stores (e.g., endoplasmic reticulum or sarcoplasmic reticulum). Although CICR was first proposed for skeletal muscle in the 1970s, it is now known that CICR is unlikely to be the primary mechanism for activating SR calcium release. Instead, CICR is thought to be crucial for excitation-contraction coupling in cardiac muscle. It is now obvious that CICR is a widely occurring cellular signaling process present even in many non-muscle cells, such as in the insulin-secreting pancreatic beta cells, epithelium, and many other cells. Since CICR is a positive-feedback system, it has been of great interest to elucidate the mechanism(s) responsible for its termination.

== Examples in biology ==
=== Excitation-contraction coupling ===
Excitation-contraction coupling in myocardium relies on sarcolemma depolarization and subsequent Ca^{2+} entry to trigger Ca^{2+} release from the sarcoplasmic reticulum. When an action potential depolarizes the cell membrane, voltage-gated Ca^{2+} channels (e.g., L-type calcium channels) are activated. CICR occurs when the resulting Ca^{2+} influx activates ryanodine receptors on the SR membrane, which causes more Ca^{2+} to be released into the cytosol. In cardiac muscle, the result of CICR is observed as a spatio-temporally restricted Ca^{2+} spark. The result of CICR across the cell causes the significant increase in cytosolic Ca^{2+} that is important in activating muscle contraction.
