= ASPH =

Protein and coding gene in humans

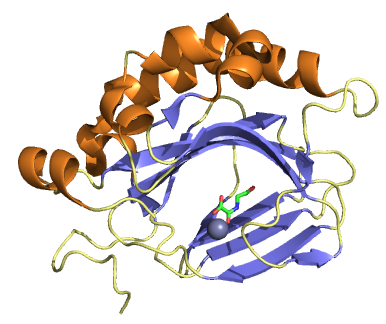

Identifiers
- Aliases: ASPH, AAH, BAH, CASQ2BP1, FDLAB, HAAH, JCTN, junctin, aspartate beta-hydroxylase
- External IDs: OMIM: 600582; MGI: 1914186; GeneCards: ASPH
Available structures
PDB	Ortholog search: PDBe RCSB
PDB	List of PDB id codes 5APA
Enzyme activity
EC #	BRENDA	ExPASy	KEGG	MetaCyc
1.14.11.16	↗	↗	↗	↗

Gene location (Human)
Chr.	Chromosome 8 (human)
Band	8q12.3	Start	61,500,556 bp
Band	8q12.3	End	61,714,640 bp

Gene location (Mouse)
Chr.	Chromosome 4 (mouse)
Band	4|4 A1	Start	9,448,069 bp
Band	4|4 A1	End	9,669,344 bp
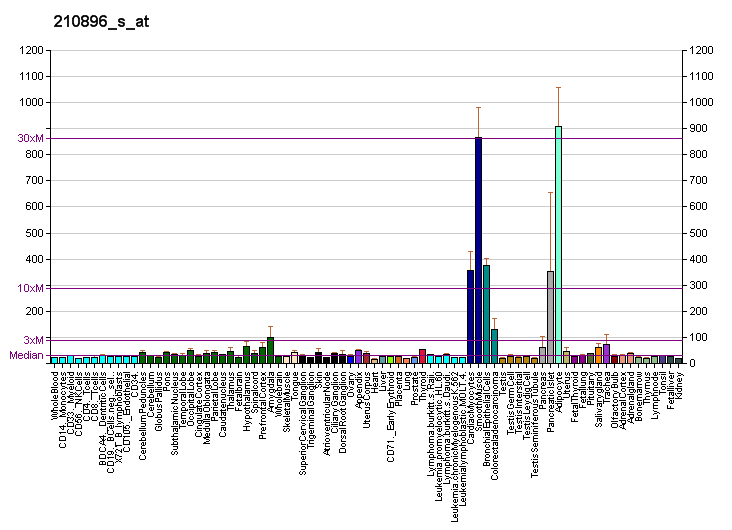

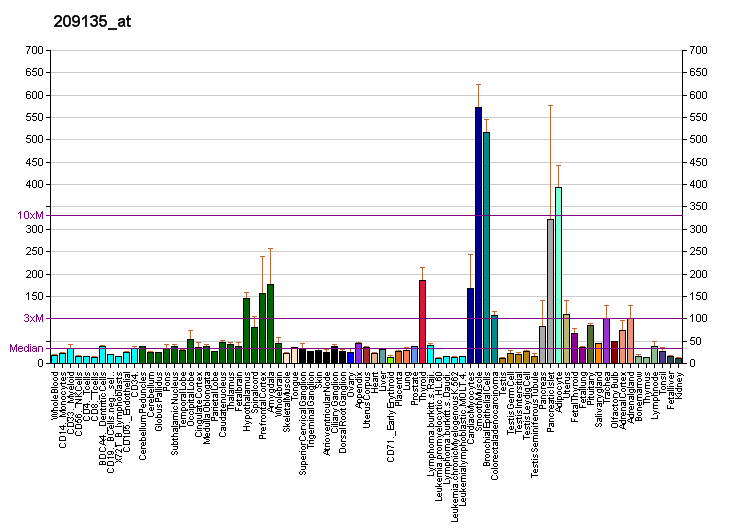

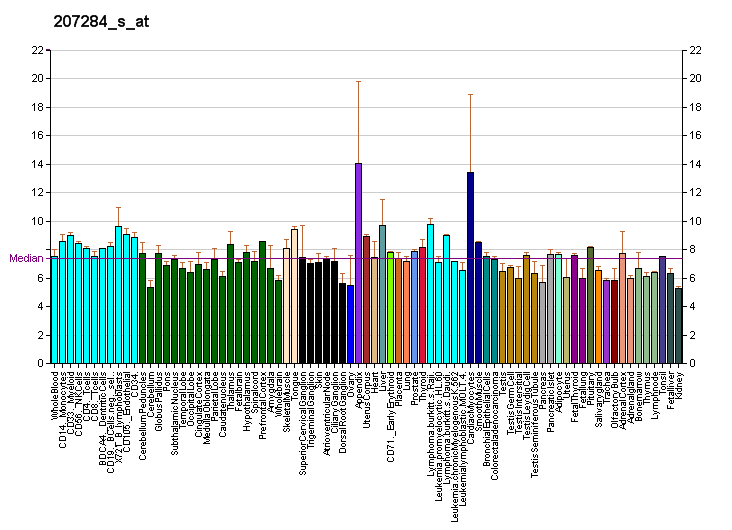
RNA expression pattern
Bgee	Human / Mouse (ortholog); Top expressed in: Achilles tendon; stromal cell of endometrium; palpebral conjunctiva; epithelium of colon; islet of Langerhans; right adrenal cortex; left adrenal gland; germinal epithelium; left adrenal cortex; adipose tissue / Top expressed in: vastus lateralis muscle; triceps brachii muscle; temporal muscle; tibialis anterior muscle; sternocleidomastoid muscle; medial head of gastrocnemius muscle; muscle of thigh; soleus muscle; digastric muscle; interventricular septum; More reference expression data
BioGPS	More reference expression data
Gene ontology
Molecular function	transmembrane transporter binding; dioxygenase activity; structural molecule activity; metal ion binding; protein binding; electron transfer activity; oxidoreductase activity; structural constituent of muscle; calcium ion binding; peptidyl-aspartic acid 3-dioxygenase activity
Cellular component	integral component of membrane; calcium channel complex; membrane; plasma membrane; cortical endoplasmic reticulum; junctional sarcoplasmic reticulum membrane; sarcoplasmic reticulum; integral component of endoplasmic reticulum membrane; sarcoplasmic reticulum membrane; sarcoplasmic reticulum lumen; endoplasmic reticulum membrane; endoplasmic reticulum; cytoplasm
Biological process	cellular response to calcium ion; positive regulation of intracellular protein transport; regulation of ryanodine-sensitive calcium-release channel activity; regulation of inositol 1,4,5-trisphosphate-sensitive calcium-release channel activity; response to ATP; regulation of cardiac conduction; muscle contraction; positive regulation of calcium ion transport into cytosol; regulation of cardiac muscle contraction by regulation of the release of sequestered calcium ion; peptidyl-amino acid modification; detection of calcium ion; positive regulation of transcription, DNA-templated; positive regulation of ryanodine-sensitive calcium-release channel activity; ion transmembrane transport; activation of cysteine-type endopeptidase activity; calcium ion transmembrane transport; positive regulation of proteolysis; regulation of cell communication by electrical coupling; regulation of release of sequestered calcium ion into cytosol by sarcoplasmic reticulum; activation of store-operated calcium channel activity; pattern specification process; negative regulation of cell population proliferation; regulation of protein stability; limb morphogenesis; peptidyl-aspartic acid hydroxylation; roof of mouth development; face morphogenesis; regulation of protein depolymerization; electron transport chain
Sources:Amigo / QuickGO
Orthologs
Databases	NCBI: entry; OMA: entry
Species	Human	Mouse
Entrez	444	65973
Ensembl	ENSG00000198363	ENSMUSG00000028207
UniProt	Q12797	Q8BSY0
RefSeq (mRNA)	NM_001164750; NM_001164751; NM_001164752; NM_001164753; NM_001164754 NM_001164755; NM_001164756; NM_004318; NM_020164; NM_032466; NM_032467; NM_032468	NM_001177849; NM_001177850; NM_001177851; NM_001177852; NM_001177853 NM_001177854; NM_001177855; NM_001177856; NM_001290367; NM_023066; NM_133723
RefSeq (protein)	NP_001158222; NP_001158223; NP_001158224; NP_001158225; NP_001158226 NP_001158227; NP_001158228; NP_004309; NP_064549; NP_115855; NP_115856; NP_115857	NP_001171320; NP_001171321; NP_001171322; NP_001171323; NP_001171324 NP_001171325; NP_001171326; NP_001171327; NP_001277296; NP_075553; NP_598484
Location (UCSC)	Chr 8: 61.5 – 61.71 Mb	Chr 4: 9.45 – 9.67 Mb
PubMed search
- Wikidata
View/Edit Human	View/Edit Mouse

Aspartyl/asparaginyl beta-hydroxylase (HAAH) is an enzyme that in humans is encoded by the ASPH gene. ASPH is an alpha-ketoglutarate-dependent hydroxylase, a superfamily non-haem iron-containing proteins.

== Function ==
This gene is thought to play an important role in calcium homeostasis. Alternative splicing of this gene results in five transcript variants which vary in protein translation, the coding of catalytic domains, and tissue expression. Variation among these transcripts impacts their functions which involve roles in the calcium storage and release process in the endoplasmic and sarcoplasmic reticulum as well as hydroxylation of aspartic acid and asparagine in epidermal growth factor-like domains of various proteins.

== Clinical significance ==
As early as 1996, the over-expression of HAAH was recognized as an indicator of carcinoma in humans. Further research has correlated elevated HAAH levels (variously in affected tissue or blood serum) with hepatocellular (liver) carcinoma adenocarcinoma (pancreatic cancer), colorectal cancer, prostate cancer. and lung cancer. The pancreatic study showed elevated HAAH only in diseased tissue, but not in adjacent normal and inflamed tissue.

Mutations in ASPH cause Traboulsi syndrome.
