= EF hand =

Protein helix–loop–helix motif

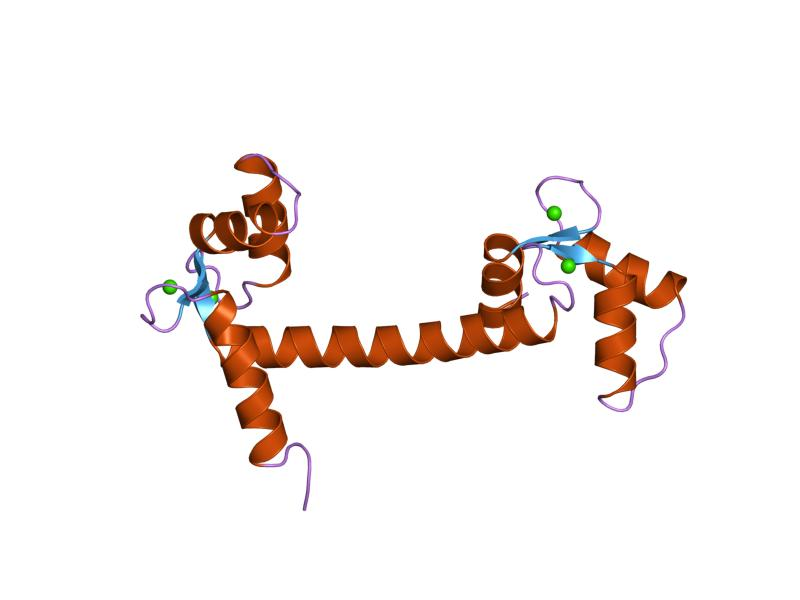
- Structure of the recombinant Paramecium tetraurelia calmodulin.

Identifiers
- Symbol: efhand
- Pfam: PF00036
- Pfam clan: CL0220
- ECOD: 108.1.1
- InterPro: IPR002048
- PROSITE: PDOC00018
- SCOP2: 1osa / SCOPe / SUPFAM
- CDD: cd00051
Available protein structures:
- PDB: IPR002048 PF00036 (ECOD; PDBsum)
- AlphaFold: IPR002048; PF00036

The EF hand is a helix–loop–helix structural domain or motif found in a large family of calcium-binding proteins.

The EF-hand motif contains a helix–loop–helix topology, much like the spread thumb and forefinger of the human hand, in which the Ca^{2+} ions are coordinated by ligands within the loop. The motif takes its name from traditional nomenclature used in describing the protein parvalbumin, which contains three such motifs and is probably involved in muscle relaxation via its calcium-binding activity.

The EF-hand consists of two alpha helices linked by a short loop region (usually about 12 amino acids) that usually binds calcium ions. EF-hands also appear in each structural domain of the signaling protein calmodulin and in the muscle protein troponin-C.

== Calcium ion binding site ==
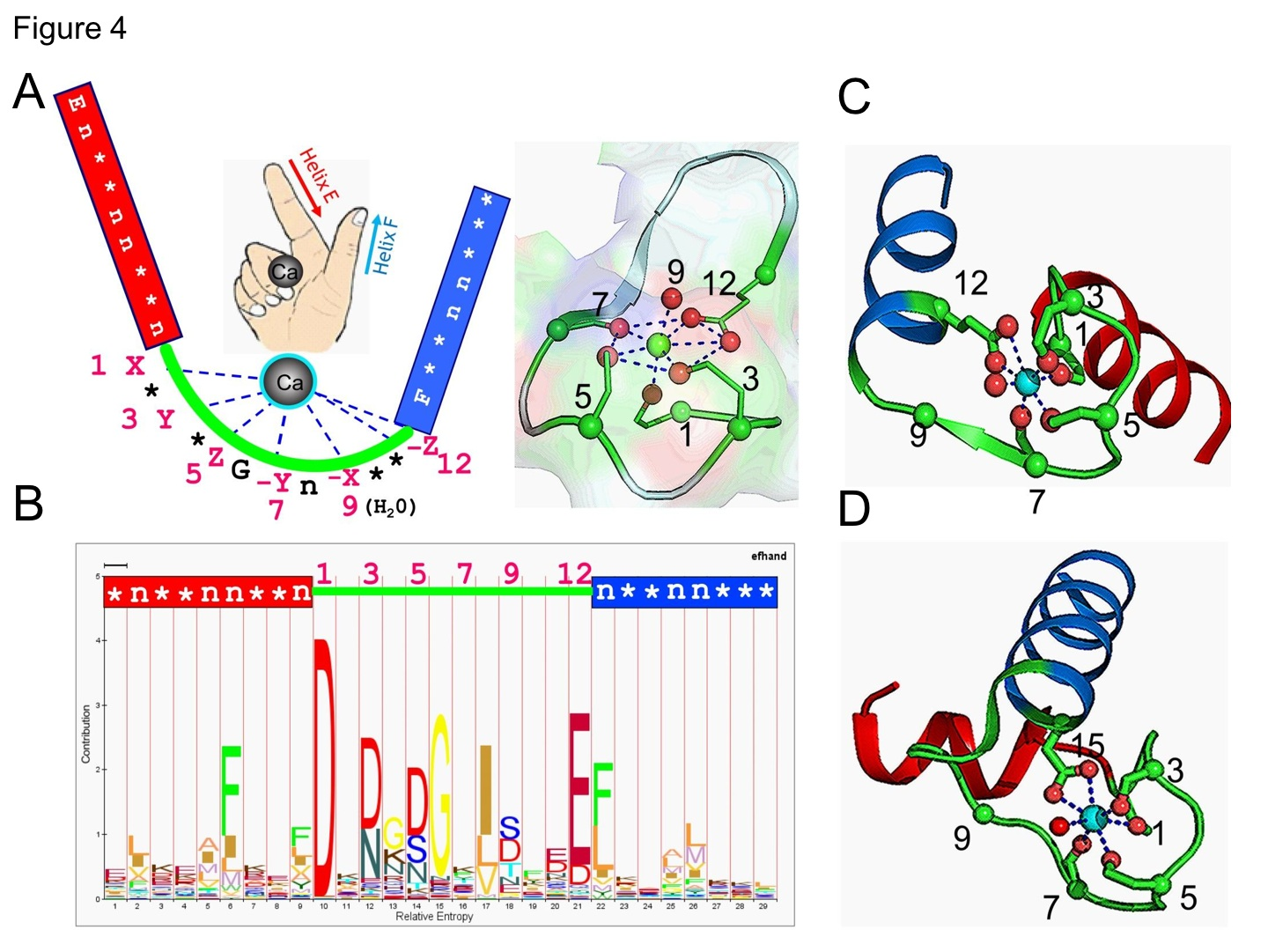
EF-hand Ca^{2+} binding motif.

The calcium ion is coordinated in a pentagonal bipyramidal configuration. The six residues involved in the binding are in positions 1, 3, 5, 7, 9 and 12; these residues are denoted by X, Y, Z, -Y, -X and -Z. The invariant Glu or Asp at position 12 provides two oxygens for liganding calcium (bidentate ligand).

The calcium ion is bound by both protein backbone atoms and by amino acid side chains, specifically those of the anionic amino acid residues aspartate and glutamate. These residues are negatively charged and will make a charge-interaction with the positively charged calcium ion. The EF hand motif was among the first structural motifs whose sequence requirements were analyzed in detail. Five of the loop residues bind calcium and thus have a strong preference for oxygen-containing side chains, especially aspartate and glutamate. The sixth residue in the loop is necessarily glycine due to the conformational requirements of the backbone. The remaining residues are typically hydrophobic and form a hydrophobic core that binds and stabilizes the two helices.

Upon binding to Ca^{2+}, this motif may undergo conformational changes that enable Ca^{2+}-regulated functions as seen in Ca^{2+} effectors such as calmodulin (CaM) and troponin C (TnC) and Ca^{2+} buffers such as calreticulin and calbindin D9k. While the majority of the known EF-hand calcium-binding proteins (CaBPs) contain paired EF-hand motifs, CaBPs with single EF hands have also been discovered in both bacteria and eukaryotes. In addition, "EF-hand-like motifs" have been found in a number of bacteria. Although the coordination properties remain similar with the canonical 29-residue helix–loop–helix EF-hand motif, the EF-hand-like motifs differ from EF-hands in that they contain deviations in the secondary structure of the flanking sequences and/or variation in the length of the Ca^{2+}-coordinating loop.

EF hands have very high selectivity for calcium. For example, the dissociation constant of alpha parvalbumin for Ca^{2+} is ~1000 times lower than that for the similar ion Mg^{2+}. This high selectivity is due to the relatively rigid coordination geometry, the presence of multiple charged amino acid side chains in the binding site, as well as the ion solvation properties.

== Prediction ==
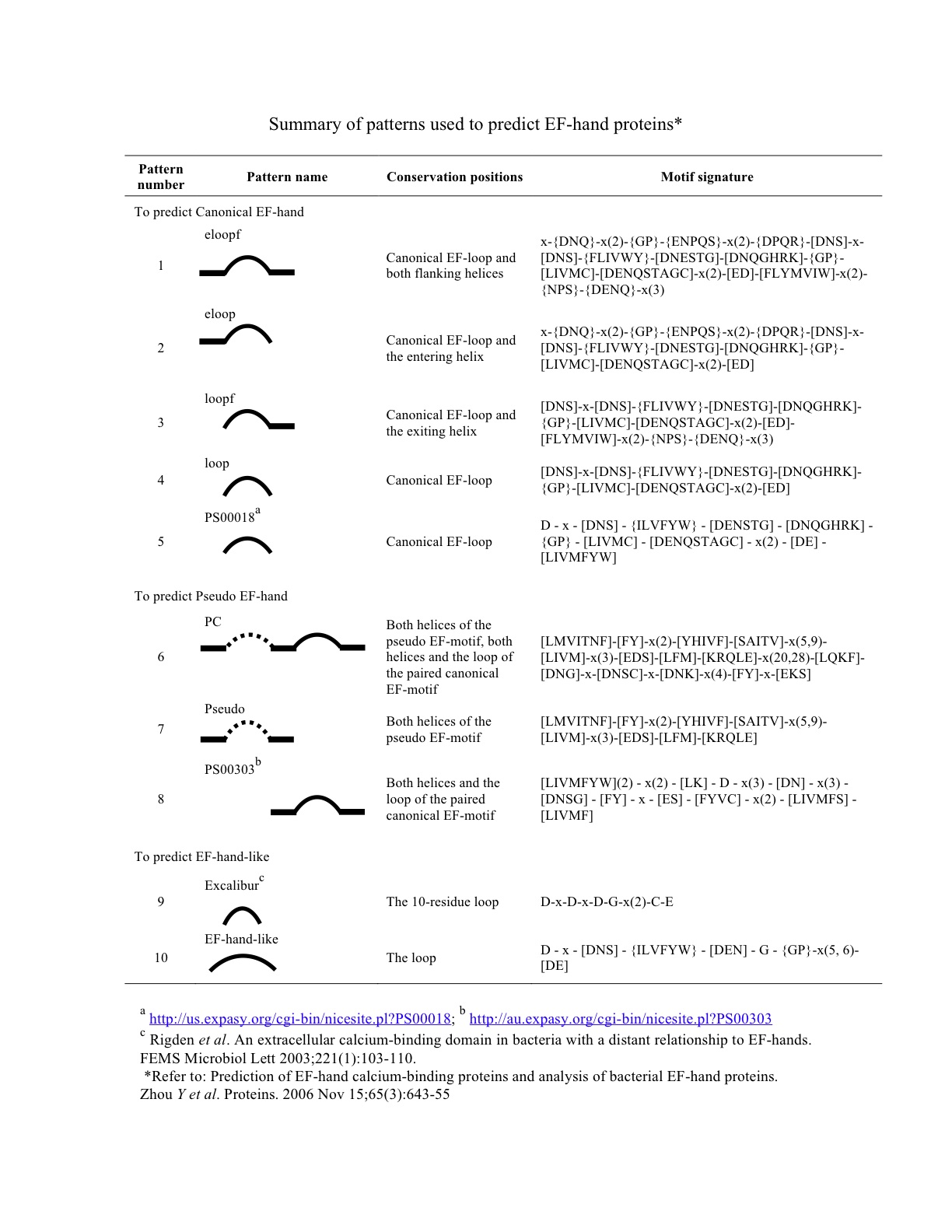
Summary of motif signatures used for prediction of EF-hands.

Pattern (motif signature) search is one of the most straightforward ways to predict continuous EF-hand Ca^{2+}-binding sites in proteins. Based on the sequence alignment results of canonical EF-hand motifs, especially the conserved side chains directly involved in Ca^{2+} binding, a pattern PS50222 has been generated to predict canonical EF-hand sites. Prediction servers may be found in the external links section.

== Classification ==
Since the delineation of the EF-hand motif in 1973, the family of EF-hand proteins has expanded to include at least 66 subfamilies thus far. EF-hand motifs are divided into two major structural groups:

- Canonical EF-hands as seen in calmodulin (CaM) and the prokaryotic CaM-like protein calerythrin. The 12-residue canonical EF-hand loop binds Ca^{2+} mainly via sidechain carboxylates or carbonyls (loop sequence positions 1, 3, 5, 12). The residue at the –X axis coordinates the Ca^{2+} ion through a bridged water molecule. The EF-hand loop has a bidentate ligand (Glu or Asp) at axis –Z.
- Pseudo EF-hands exclusively found in the N-termini of S100 and S100-like proteins. The 14-residue pseudo EF-hand loop chelates Ca^{2+} primarily via backbone carbonyls (positions 1, 4, 6, 9).

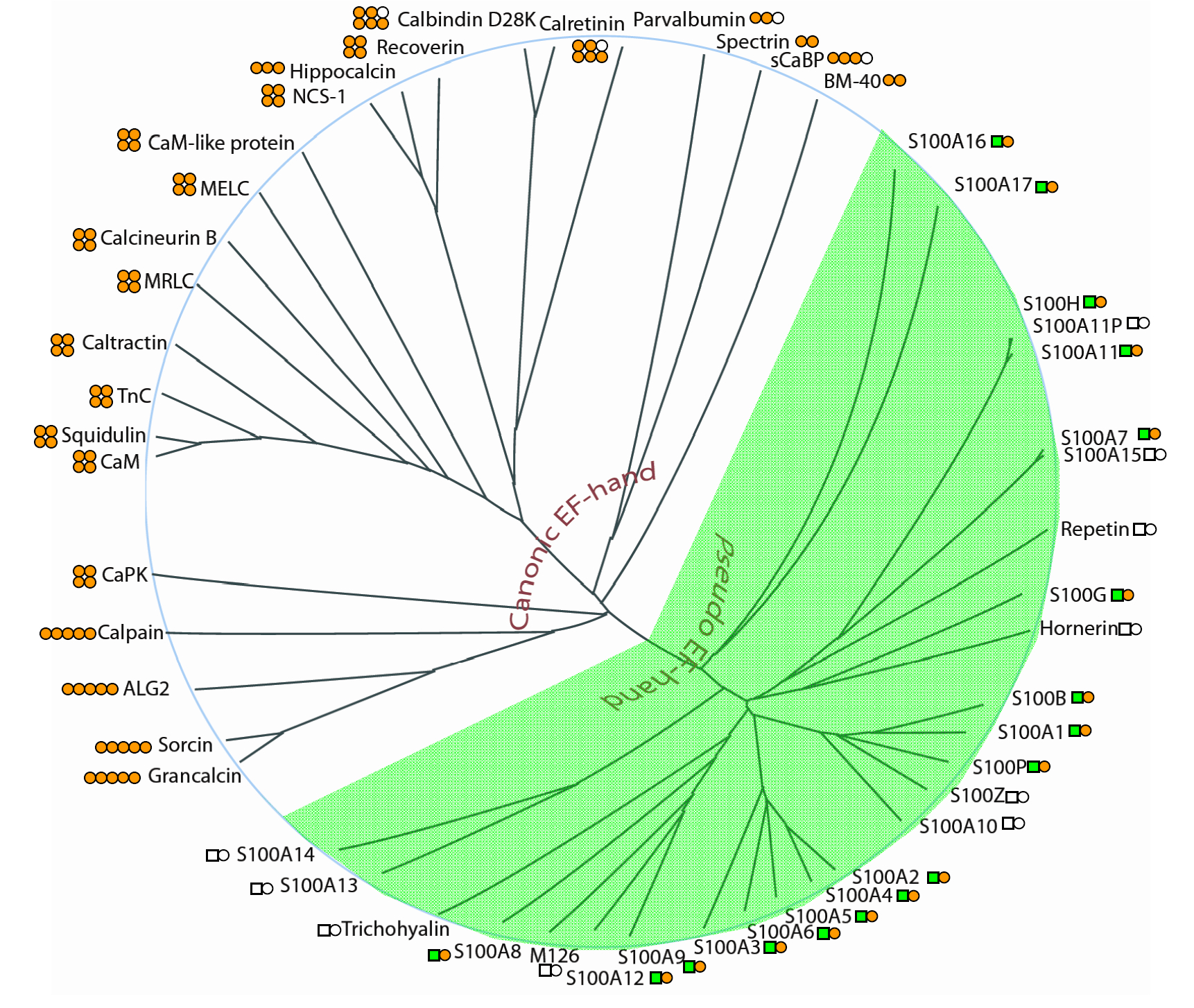
Phylogenetic tree of the EF-hand protein family.

Additional points:

- EF-hand-like proteins with diversified flanking structural elements around the Ca^{2+}-binding loop have been reported in bacteria and viruses. These prokaryotic EF-hand-like proteins are widely implicated in Ca^{2+} signaling and homeostasis in bacteria. They contain flexible lengths of Ca^{2+}-binding loops that differ from the EF-hand motifs. However, their coordination properties resemble classical EF-hand motifs.
  - For example, the semi-continuous Ca^{2+}-binding site in D-galactose-binding protein (GBP) contains a nine-residue loop. The Ca^{2+} ion is coordinated by seven protein oxygen atoms, five of which are from the loop mimicking the canonical EF-loop whereas the other two are from the carboxylate group of a distant Glu.
  - Another example is a novel domain named Excalibur (extracellular Ca^{2+}-binding region) isolated from Bacillus subtilis. This domain has a conserved 10-residue Ca^{2+}-binding loop strikingly similar to the canonical 12-residue EF-hand loop.
  - The diversity of the structure of the flanking region is illustrated by the discovery of EF-hand-like domains in bacterial proteins. For example, a helix–loop–strand instead of the helix–loop–helix structure is in periplasmic galactose-binding protein (Salmonella typhimurium, PDB: 1gcg) or alginate-binding protein (Sphingomonas sp., 1kwh); the entering helix is missing in protective antigen (Bacillus anthracis, 1acc) or dockerin (Clostridium thermocellum, 1daq).

Among all the structures reported to date, the majority of EF-hand motifs are paired either between two canonical or one pseudo and one canonical motifs. For proteins with odd numbers of EF-hands, such as the penta-EF-hand calpain, EF-hand motifs were coupled through homo- or hetero-dimerization. The recently identified EF-hand containing ER Ca^{2+} sensor protein, stromal interaction molecule 1 and 2 (STIM1, STIM2), has been shown to contain a Ca^{2+}-binding canonical EF-hand motif that pairs with an immediate, downstream atypical "hidden" non-Ca^{2+}-binding EF-hand. Single EF-hand motifs can serve as protein-docking modules: for example, the single EF hand in the NKD1 and NKD2 proteins binds the Dishevelled (DVL1, DVL2, DVL3) proteins.

Functionally, the EF-hands can be divided into two classes:

1. signaling proteins
2. buffering/transport proteins.

The first group is the largest and includes the most well-known members of the family such as calmodulin, troponin C and S100B. These proteins typically undergo a calcium-dependent conformational change which opens a target binding site. The latter group is represented by calbindin D9k and these proteins do not undergo calcium dependent conformational changes.

=== Subfamilies ===
- EPS15 homology (EH) domain – InterPro: IPR000261

== Examples ==
=== Aequorin ===
Aequorin is a calcium binding protein (CaBP) isolated from the cnidarian Aequorea victoria. Aequorin belongs to the EF-hand family of CaBPs, with EF-hand loops that are closely related to CaBPs in mammals. In addition, aequorin has been used for years as an indicator of Ca^{2+} and has been shown to be safe and well tolerated by cells. Aequorin is made up of two components – the calcium binding component apoaequorin (AQ) and the chemiluminescent molecule coelenterazine. The AQ portion of this protein contains the EF-hand calcium binding domains.

=== Human proteins ===
Humans proteins containing this domain include:

- ACTN1; ACTN2; ACTN3; ACTN4; APBA2BP; AYTL1; AYTL2
- C14orf143; CABP1; CABP2; CABP3; CABP4; CABP5; CABP7; CALB1; CALB2; CALM2; CALM3; CALML3; CALML4; CALML5; CALML6; CALN1; CALU; CAPN1; CAPN11; CAPN2; CAPN3; CAPN9; CAPNS1; CAPNS2; CAPS; CAPS2; CAPSL; CETN1; CETN2; CETN3; CHP; CHP2; CIB1; CIB2; CIB3; CIB4; CRNN
- DGKA; DGKB; DGKG; DST; DUOX1; DUOX2
- EFCAB1; EFCAB2; EFCAB4A; EFCAB4B; EFCAB6; EFCBP1; EFCBP2; EFHA1; EFHA2; EFHB; EFHC1; EFHD1; EFHD2; EPS15; EPS15L1
- FKBP10; FKBP14; FKBP7; FKBP9; FKBP9L; FREQ; FSTL1; FSTL5
- GCA; GPD2; GUCA1A; GUCA1B; GUCA1C
- hippocalcin; HPCAL1; HPCAL4; HZGJ
- IFPS; ITSN1; ITSN2; KCNIP1; KCNIP2; KCNIP3; KCNIP4; KIAA1799
- LCP1
- MACF1; MICU1; MRLC2; MRLC3; MST133; MYL1; MYL2; MYL5; MYL6B; MYL7; MYL9; MYLC2PL; MYLPF
- NCALD; NIN; NKD1; NKD2; NLP; NOX5; NUCB1; NUCB2
- OCM
- PDCD6; PEF1; PKD2; PLCD1; PLCD4; PLCH1; PLCH2; PLS1; PLS3; PP1187; PPEF1; PPEF2; PPP3R1; PPP3R2; PRKCSH; PVALB
- RAB11FIP3; RASEF; RASGRP; RASGRP1; RASGRP2; RASGRP3; RCN1; RCN2; RCN3; RCV1; RCVRN; REPS1; RHBDL3; RHOT1; RHOT2; RPTN; RYR2; RYR3
- S100A1; S100A11; S100A12; S100A6; S100A8; S100A9; S100B; S100G; S100Z; SCAMC-2; SCGN; SCN5A; SDF4; SLC25A12; SLC25A13; SLC25A23; SLC25A24; SLC25A25; SPATA21; SPTA1; SPTAN1; SRI
- TBC1D9; TBC1D9B; TCHH; TESC; TNNC1; TNNC2
- USP32
- VSNL1
- ZZEF1

== See also ==
- Another distinct calcium-binding motif composed of alpha helices is the dockerin domain.
