= Neuronal calcium sensor =

Neuronal Calcium Sensor is a large family of proteins which work as calcium dependent molecular switches and includes members like Frequenin (NCS1), recoverin, GCAP, neurocalcin, visinin etc. All the members carry 4 EF hand motifs (out of which only 2 or 3 bind calcium) and an N-myristoyl group.

== Members of NCS family ==
- Highly evolutionarily conserved
- NCS1 (Frequenin)
- VILIP-1 (Visinin-like-protein-1)
- HPCAL4 (Visinin-like-protein-2)
- HPCAL1 (Visinin-like-protein-3)
- hippocalcin
- neurocalcin
- recoverin
- Guanylate cyclase activator proteins (GCAPs)
- Potassium Channel interacting proteins (KChIPs 1–4), including:

KCNIP1, KCNIP2, Calsenilin or DREAM/KChIP-3/KCNIP3 (downstream regulatory element antagonist modulator/potassium channel interacting protein), KCNIP4
