= Kv channel interacting protein =

Kv channel interacting proteins are members of a family of voltage-gated potassium (K_{v}) channel-interacting proteins (KCNIPs, also frequently called "KChIP"), which belong to the recoverin branch of the EF-hand superfamily. Members of the KCNIP family are small calcium binding proteins. They all have EF-hand-like domains, and differ from each other in the N-terminus. They are integral subunit components of native K_{v}4 channel complexes. They may regulate A-type currents, and hence neuronal excitability, in response to changes in intracellular calcium. Alternative splicing results in multiple transcript variant encoding different isoforms.

Members of this family include:

- KCNIP1, a protein that in humans is encoded by the KCNIP1 gene.
- KCNIP2, a protein that in humans is encoded by the KCNIP2 gene.
- KCNIP3, more commonly known as Calsenilin, a protein that in humans is encoded by the KCNIP3 gene.
- KCNIP4, a protein that in humans is encoded by the KCNIP4 gene.
