= Calumenin =

Protein found in humans

CALU

Identifiers
- Aliases: CALU, calumenin
- External IDs: OMIM: 603420; MGI: 1097158; GeneCards: CALU

Gene location (Human)
Chr.	Chromosome 7 (human)
Band	7q32.1	Start	128,739,292 bp
Band	7q32.1	End	128,773,400 bp

Gene location (Mouse)
Chr.	Chromosome 6 (mouse)
Band	6|6 A3.3	Start	29,348,068 bp
Band	6|6 A3.3	End	29,377,109 bp
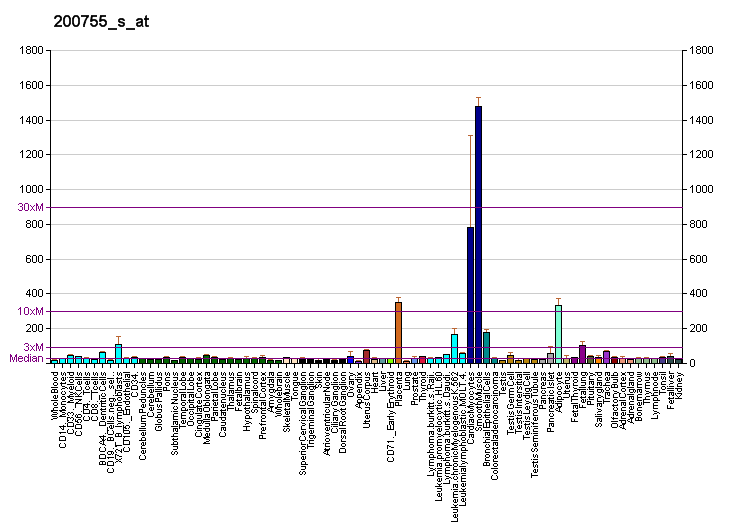

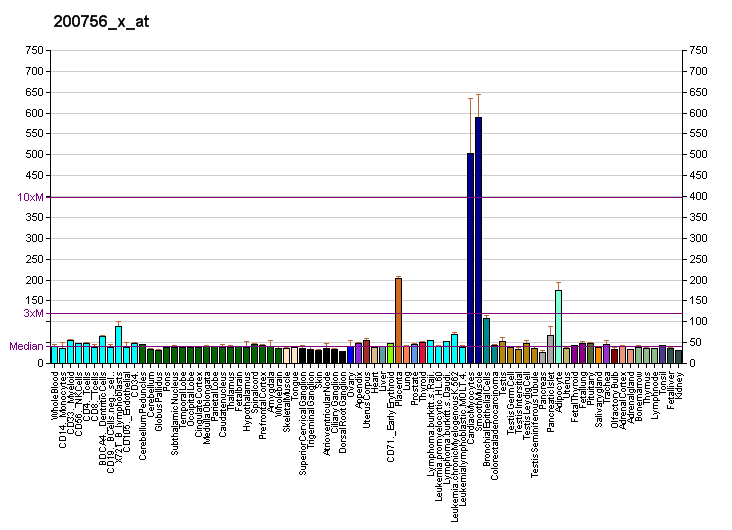

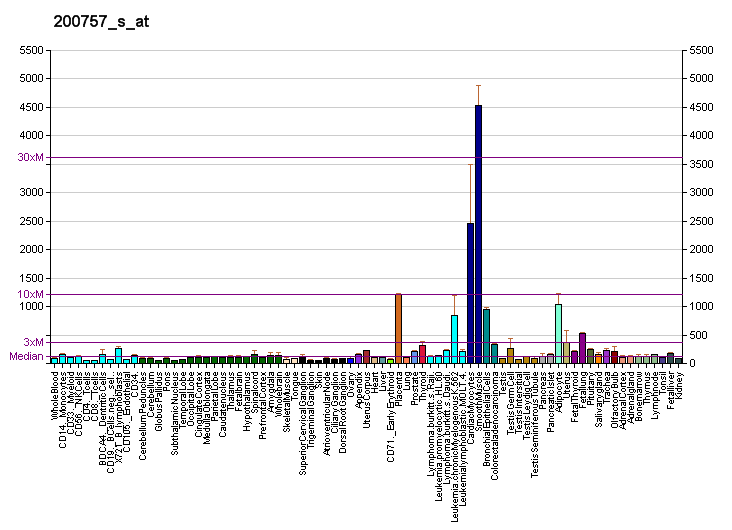
RNA expression pattern
Bgee	Human / Mouse (ortholog); Top expressed in: stromal cell of endometrium; smooth muscle tissue; tendon of biceps brachii; thoracic aorta; ascending aorta; right coronary artery; Achilles tendon; Descending thoracic aorta; left coronary artery; popliteal artery / Top expressed in: gastrula; calvaria; dermis; efferent ductule; molar; stroma of bone marrow; umbilical cord; body of femur; atrium; Gonadal ridge; More reference expression data
BioGPS	More reference expression data
Gene ontology
Molecular function	calcium ion binding; metal ion binding; protein binding
Cellular component	Golgi apparatus; endoplasmic reticulum membrane; membrane; melanosome; sarcoplasmic reticulum; extracellular region; endoplasmic reticulum; sarcoplasmic reticulum lumen; endoplasmic reticulum lumen
Biological process	post-translational protein modification; biological process
Sources:Amigo / QuickGO
Orthologs
Databases	NCBI: entry; OMA: entry
Species	Human	Mouse
Entrez	813	12321
Ensembl	ENSG00000128595	ENSMUSG00000029767
UniProt	O43852	O35887
RefSeq (mRNA)	NM_001130674; NM_001199671; NM_001199672; NM_001199673; NM_001199674 NM_001219	NM_001285412; NM_007594; NM_184053
RefSeq (protein)	NP_001124146; NP_001186600; NP_001186601; NP_001186602; NP_001210	NP_001272341; NP_031620; NP_908942
Location (UCSC)	Chr 7: 128.74 – 128.77 Mb	Chr 6: 29.35 – 29.38 Mb
PubMed search
- Wikidata
View/Edit Human	View/Edit Mouse

Calumenin is a protein that in humans is encoded by the CALU gene.

Calumenin (CALU) is a calcium-binding protein localized in the endoplasmic reticulum (ER) and is involved in such ER functions as protein folding and sorting. Calumenin is a member of the EF-hand superfamily in the ER and Golgi apparatus named CERC. CERC is an acronym for its family members Cab-45, reticulocalbin, Erc-55 (RCN2), and calumenin. The CALU gene encodes a deduced 315-amino acid protein containing 6 EF-hand motifs, 1 potential N-glycosylation site, and a C-terminal ER retention signal. The human and mouse CALU proteins are 98% identical. CALU mRNA is ubiquitously expressed in human tissues and maps to 7q32.
