= Neuronal calcium sensor-1 =

Neuronal calcium sensory protein

NCS1
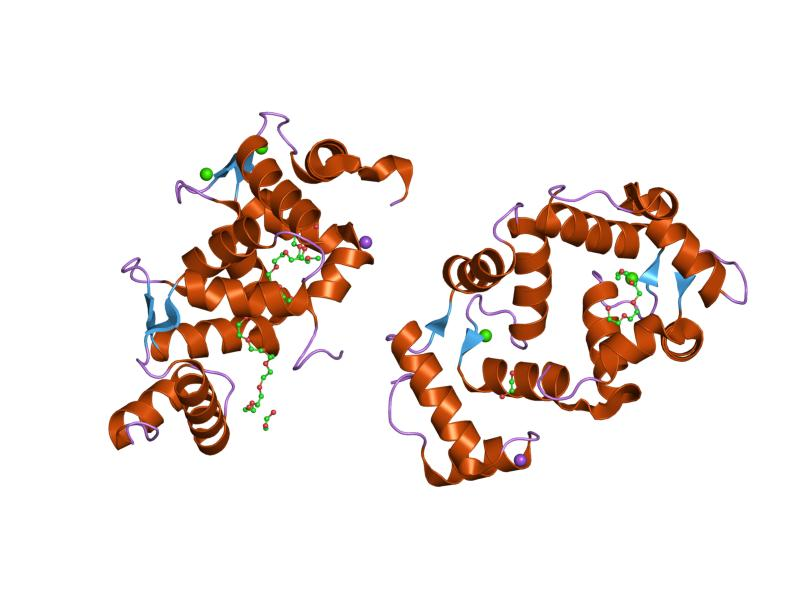

Identifiers
- Aliases: NCS1, FLUP, FREQ, neuronal calcium sensor 1
- External IDs: OMIM: 603315; MGI: 109166; GeneCards: NCS1
Available structures
PDB	Ortholog search: PDBe RCSB
PDB	List of PDB id codes 4GUK, 1G8I, 2LCP, 5AER, 5AFP, 5AEQ

Gene location (Human)
Chr.	Chromosome 9 (human)
Band	9q34.11	Start	130,172,404 bp
Band	9q34.11	End	130,237,303 bp

Gene location (Mouse)
Chr.	Chromosome 2 (mouse)
Band	2|2 B	Start	31,135,835 bp
Band	2|2 B	End	31,186,001 bp
RNA expression pattern
Bgee	Human / Mouse (ortholog); Top expressed in: right frontal lobe; anterior cingulate cortex; nucleus accumbens; amygdala; dorsolateral prefrontal cortex; postcentral gyrus; Brodmann area 9; prefrontal cortex; caudate nucleus; hippocampus proper / Top expressed in: dentate gyrus of hippocampal formation granule cell; superior frontal gyrus; nucleus accumbens; medial geniculate nucleus; subiculum; medial dorsal nucleus; dorsomedial hypothalamic nucleus; olfactory tubercle; primary visual cortex; cerebellar cortex; More reference expression data
BioGPS	n/a
Gene ontology
Molecular function	calcium ion binding; voltage-gated calcium channel activity; metal ion binding; protein binding; magnesium ion binding; protein kinase binding; voltage-gated calcium channel activity involved in regulation of presynaptic cytosolic calcium levels
Cellular component	cytoplasm; cytosol; postsynaptic membrane; Golgi apparatus; membrane; postsynaptic density; intracellular membrane-bounded organelle; plasma membrane; synapse; axon; cell junction; dendrite; perinuclear region of cytoplasm; dense core granule; cytoplasmic vesicle; calyx of Held; postsynapse; glutamatergic synapse; presynaptic cytosol; postsynaptic cytosol
Biological process	regulation of neuron projection development; calcium ion transmembrane transport; positive regulation of exocytosis; phosphatidylinositol-mediated signaling; regulation of synaptic vesicle exocytosis; regulation of presynaptic cytosolic calcium ion concentration
Sources:Amigo / QuickGO
Orthologs
Databases	NCBI: entry; OMA: entry
Species	Human	Mouse
Entrez	23413	14299
Ensembl	ENSG00000107130	ENSMUSG00000062661
UniProt	P62166	Q8BNY6
RefSeq (mRNA)	NM_014286; NM_001128826	NM_019681
RefSeq (protein)	NP_001122298; NP_055101	NP_062655
Location (UCSC)	Chr 9: 130.17 – 130.24 Mb	Chr 2: 31.14 – 31.19 Mb
PubMed search
- Wikidata
View/Edit Human	View/Edit Mouse

Neuronal calcium sensor-1 (NCS-1) also known as frequenin homolog (Drosophila) (freq) is a protein that is encoded by the FREQ gene in humans. NCS-1 is a member of the neuronal calcium sensor family, a class of EF hand containing calcium-myristoyl-switch proteins.

== Function ==
NCS-1 regulates synaptic transmission, helps control the dynamics of nerve terminal growth, is critical for some forms of learning and memory in C. elegans and mammals, regulates corticohippocampal plasticity; and enhancing levels of NCS-1 in the mouse dentate gyrus increases spontaneous exploration of safe environments, potentially linking NCS-1 to curiosity.

NCS-1 is a calcium sensor, not a calcium buffer (chelator); thus it is a high-affinity, low-capacity, calcium-binding protein.

Frq can substitute for calmodulin in some situations. It is thought to be associated with neuronal secretory vesicles and regulate neurosecretion.

1. It is the Ca^{2+}-sensing subunit of the yeast phosphatidylinositol (PtdIns)-4-OH kinase, PIK1
2. It binds to many proteins, some in calcium dependent and some in calcium independent ways, and switches many of the targets "on" (some off).
  1. Calcineurin (protein phosphatase 2B)
  2. GRK2 (G-protein-coupled receptor kinase 2)
  3. D_{2} dopamine receptor
  4. IL1RAPL1 (interleukin-1 receptor accessory protein-like 1 protein)
  5. PI4KIIIβ (type III phosphatidylinositol 4-kinase β)
  6. IP3 receptor (this activity is inhibited by lithium - a drug used for the treatment of bipolar disorder)
  7. 3',5'-cyclic nucleotide phosphodiesterases
  8. ARF1 (ADP Ribosylation factor 1)
  9. A type (K_{v}4.3; Shal-related subfamily, member 3) voltage-gated potassium channels
  10. Nitric oxide synthase
  11. TRPC5 channel
  12. Ric8a
3. Frq modulates Ca^{2+} entry through a functional interaction with the α_{1} voltage-gated Ca^{2+}-channel subunit.

Additionally, NCS-1 is redox-sensitive: under oxidizing conditions it forms a covalent disulfide-linked dimer via Cys38 (dNCS-1). Elevation of free Zn²⁺ (as during oxidative stress) specifically promotes this dimerization, whereas increasing intracellular Ca²⁺ does not. The dimer binds Ca²⁺ in only one EF-hand per monomer, displays reduced α-helicity and thermal stability with increased surface hydrophobicity, and shows ~20-fold higher affinity for GRK1 accompanied by stronger inhibition of the kinase. dNCS-1 can also coordinate Zn²⁺ and exhibits asymmetrical, more flexible subunits. In cells, dNCS-1 is reduced by the thioredoxin system; otherwise it accumulates in perinuclear puncta and aggregates targeted by the proteasome. Notably, NCS-1 silencing decreases susceptibility to oxidative-stress-induced apoptosis in Y79 cells, implicating NCS-1 in redox-regulated survival pathways.

== Structure ==
NCS-1 is a globular protein consisting of ten alpha-helices. Four pairs of alpha-helices each form independent 12-amino-acid loops containing a negatively charged calcium binding domain known as an EF-hand. However, only three of these EF hands are functional (the most N-terminal EF-hand does not bind calcium). They could be occupied not only by calcium but also by magnesium and zinc ions. NCS-1 also contains at least two known protein binding domains, and a large surface exposed hydrophobic crevice containing EF-hands three and four. There is a myristoylation motif at the N-terminus that presumably allows NCS-1 to associate with lipid membranes.

== Clinical significance ==
The expression of NCS-1 increases in bipolar disorder and some forms of schizophrenia and decreases in inflammatory bowel disease. A mutant of NCS-1, R102Q, has also been found in one patient with Autism. In addition NCS-1 is significant in intelligence in creating curiosity by its function on dopamine D2 receptors in the dentate gyrus, increasing memory for complex tasks. Interactions of lithium ions (Li+) with NCS-1 has also been linked as a possible treatment for protection against psychotic disorders.

== History ==
NCS-1 was originally discovered in Drosophila as a gain-of-function mutation associated with frequency-dependent increases in neurotransmission. A role in neurotransmission was later confirmed in Drosophila using frq null mutants. Work in bovine chromaffin cells demonstrated that NCS-1 is also a modulator of neurotransmission in mammals. The designation 'NCS-1' came from the assumption that the protein was expressed only in neuronal cell types, which is not the case.
