= Hippocalcin-like protein 4 =

Protein found in humans

HPCAL4

Identifiers
- Aliases: HPCAL4, HLP4, hippocalcin like 4
- External IDs: MGI: 2157521; GeneCards: HPCAL4

Gene location (Human)
Chr.	Chromosome 1 (human)
Band	1p34.2	Start	39,678,648 bp
Band	1p34.2	End	39,691,485 bp

Gene location (Mouse)
Chr.	Chromosome 4 (mouse)
Band	4|4 D2.2	Start	123,077,020 bp
Band	4|4 D2.2	End	123,088,494 bp
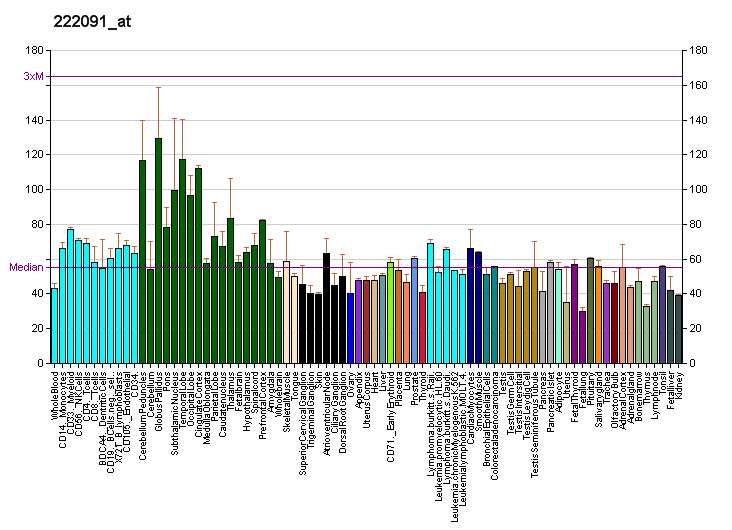

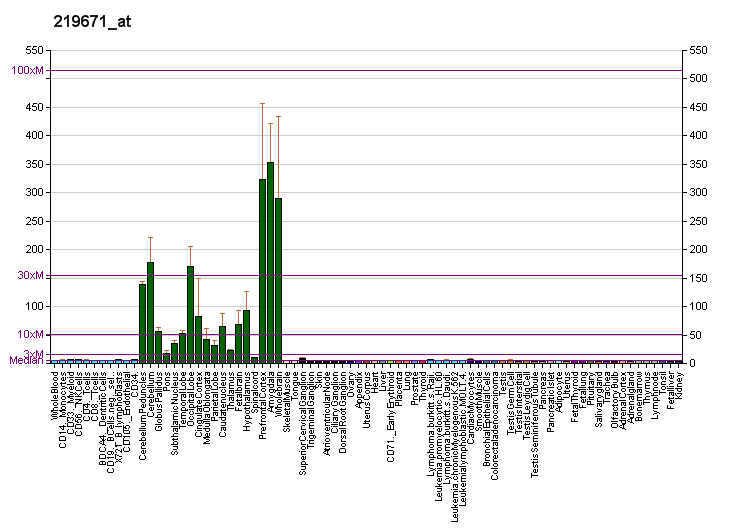
RNA expression pattern
Bgee	Human / Mouse (ortholog); Top expressed in: right frontal lobe; prefrontal cortex; cerebellar cortex; cerebellar hemisphere; right hemisphere of cerebellum; anterior cingulate cortex; dorsolateral prefrontal cortex; nucleus accumbens; amygdala; Brodmann area 9 / Top expressed in: subiculum; amygdala; piriform cortex; anterior amygdaloid area; Region I of hippocampus proper; nucleus accumbens; prefrontal cortex; primary motor cortex; hippocampus proper; dentate gyrus; More reference expression data
BioGPS	More reference expression data
Gene ontology
Molecular function	calcium ion binding; calcium channel regulator activity; protein binding; metal ion binding; protein C-terminus binding; protein domain specific binding
Cellular component	intracellular anatomical structure
Biological process	central nervous system development; signal transduction
Sources:Amigo / QuickGO
Orthologs
Databases	NCBI: entry; OMA: entry
Species	Human	Mouse
Entrez	51440	170638
Ensembl	ENSG00000116983	ENSMUSG00000046093
UniProt	Q9UM19	Q8BGZ1
RefSeq (mRNA)	NM_016257; NM_001282396; NM_001282397	NM_174998
RefSeq (protein)	NP_001269325; NP_001269326; NP_057341	NP_778163
Location (UCSC)	Chr 1: 39.68 – 39.69 Mb	Chr 4: 123.08 – 123.09 Mb
PubMed search
- Wikidata
View/Edit Human	View/Edit Mouse

Hippocalcin like 4, also known as HPCAL4, is a human gene.

== Function ==
The protein encoded by this gene is highly similar to human hippocalcin protein and hippocalcin like-1 protein. It also has similarity to rat neural visinin-like Ca2+-binding protein-type 1 and 2 proteins. It is a member of the neuronal calcium sensor family. This encoded protein may be involved in the calcium-dependent regulation of rhodopsin phosphorylation. The transcript of this gene has multiple polyadenylation sites.
