= CALN1 =

Protein-coding gene in humans

Identifiers
- Aliases: CALN1, CABP8, calneuron 1
- External IDs: OMIM: 607176; MGI: 2155987; GeneCards: CALN1

Gene location (Human)
Chr.	Chromosome 7 (human)
Band	7q11.22	Start	71,779,491 bp
Band	7q11.22	End	72,447,151 bp

Gene location (Mouse)
Chr.	Chromosome 5 (mouse)
Band	5|5 G1.3- G2	Start	130,398,296 bp
Band	5|5 G1.3- G2	End	130,876,253 bp
RNA expression pattern
Bgee	Human / Mouse (ortholog); Top expressed in: cerebellar vermis; pons; pars reticulata; cerebellar hemisphere; pars compacta; right hemisphere of cerebellum; entorhinal cortex; external globus pallidus; Brodmann area 46; middle temporal gyrus / Top expressed in: nucleus accumbens; dorsal striatum; olfactory tubercle; facial motor nucleus; deep cerebellar nuclei; cerebellar cortex; globus pallidus; cerebellar vermis; lobe of cerebellum; temporal lobe; More reference expression data
BioGPS	n/a
Orthologs
Databases	NCBI: entry; OMA: entry
Species	Human	Mouse
Entrez	83698	140904
Ensembl	ENSG00000183166	ENSMUSG00000060371
UniProt	Q9BXU9	Q9JJG7
RefSeq (mRNA)	NM_001017440; NM_031468; NM_001363460	NM_021371; NM_181045
RefSeq (protein)	NP_001017440; NP_113656; NP_001350389	NP_067346; NP_851388
Location (UCSC)	Chr 7: 71.78 – 72.45 Mb	Chr 5: 130.4 – 130.88 Mb
PubMed search
- Wikidata
View/Edit Human	View/Edit Mouse

Calcium-binding protein 8 is a protein that in humans is encoded by the CALN1 gene. Alternative splicing results in multiple transcript variants.

== Function ==
This gene encodes a protein with high similarity to the calcium-binding proteins of the calmodulin family. The encoded protein contains two EF-hand domains and potential calcium-binding sites.
