= Nucleobindin 1 =

Protein-coding gene in the species Homo sapiens

NUCB1
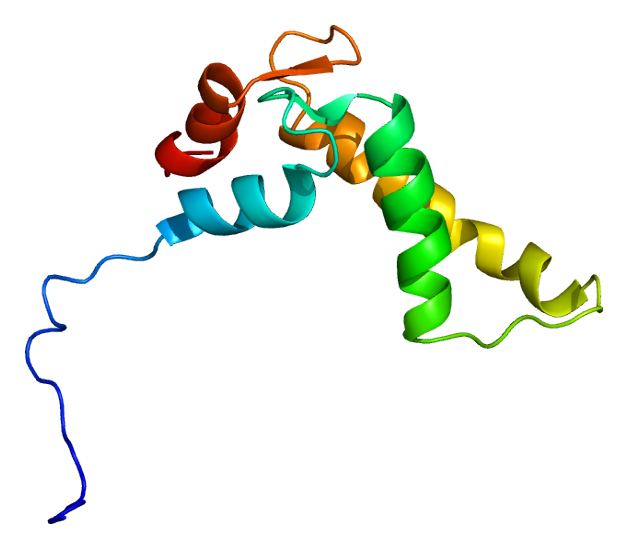

Identifiers
- Aliases: NUCB1, CALNUC, NUC, nucleobindin 1
- External IDs: OMIM: 601323; MGI: 97388; GeneCards: NUCB1
Available structures
| PDB | Ortholog search: PDBe RCSB |
| PDB | List of PDB id codes 1SNL |

Gene location (Human)
| Chr. | Chromosome 19 (human) |
| Band | 19q13.33 | Start | 48,900,312 bp |
| Band | 19q13.33 | End | 48,923,372 bp |

Gene location (Mouse)
| Chr. | Chromosome 7 (mouse) |
| Band | 7|7 B3 | Start | 45,139,882 bp |
| Band | 7|7 B3 | End | 45,159,830 bp |
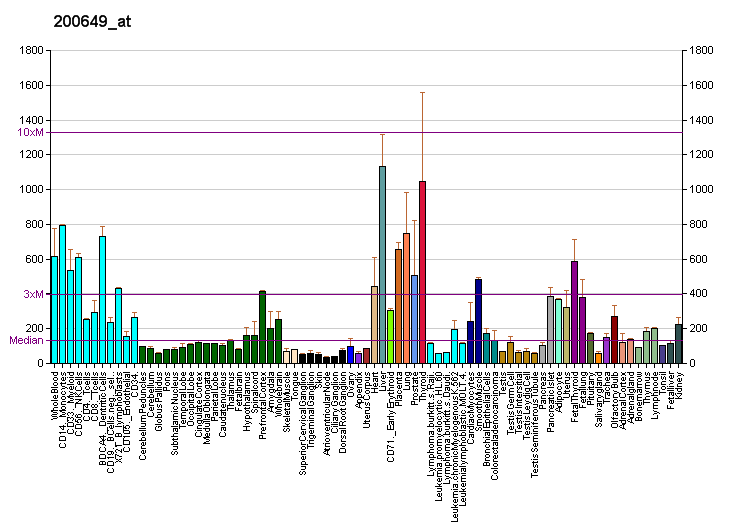

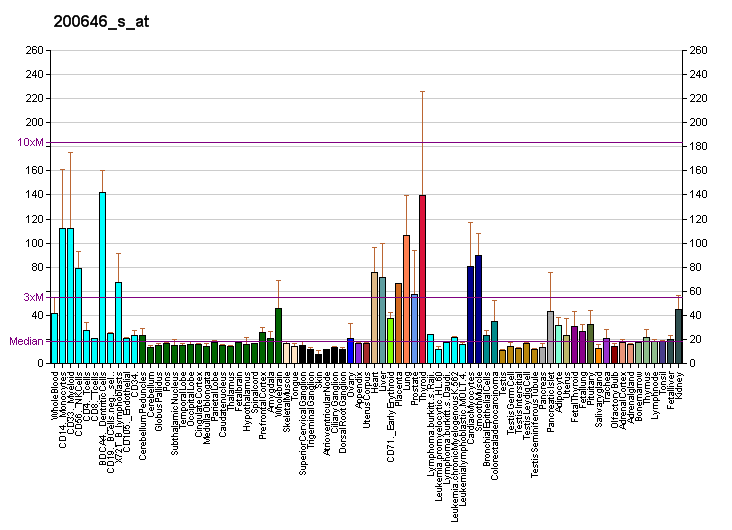
RNA expression pattern
| Bgee | Human / Mouse (ortholog); Top expressed in: stromal cell of endometrium; Descending thoracic aorta; right lobe of liver; apex of heart; ascending aorta; left coronary artery; right coronary artery; right lobe of thyroid gland; right auricle of heart; upper lobe of left lung / Top expressed in: external carotid artery; choroid plexus of fourth ventricle; internal carotid artery; right kidney; lip; calvaria; large intestine; colon; ileum; duodenum; More reference expression data |
| BioGPS | More reference expression data |
Gene ontology
| Molecular function | DNA binding; calcium ion binding; metal ion binding; protein binding; G-protein alpha-subunit binding |
| Cellular component | cytoplasm; lumenal side of Golgi membrane; rough endoplasmic reticulum; membrane; cis-Golgi network; Golgi-associated vesicle; Golgi cisterna membrane; extracellular region; extrinsic component of Golgi membrane; trans-Golgi network; early endosome; extracellular exosome; nucleus; endoplasmic reticulum-Golgi intermediate compartment; extracellular space; Golgi apparatus; endoplasmic reticulum lumen |
| Biological process | regulation of protein targeting; response to cisplatin; post-translational protein modification |
Sources:Amigo / QuickGO
Orthologs
| Databases | NCBI: entry; OMA: entry |
| Species | Human | Mouse |
| Entrez | 4924 | 18220 |
| Ensembl | ENSG00000104805 | ENSMUSG00000030824 |
| UniProt | Q02818 | Q02819 |
| RefSeq (mRNA) | NM_006184 | NM_001163662; NM_008749 |
| RefSeq (protein) | NP_006175 | NP_001157134; NP_032775 |
| Location (UCSC) | Chr 19: 48.9 – 48.92 Mb | Chr 7: 45.14 – 45.16 Mb |
| PubMed search |
- Wikidata
| View/Edit Human | View/Edit Mouse |

Nucleobindin-1 (NUCB1), also known as calnuc, is a protein that in humans is encoded by the NUCB1 gene.

== Structure ==
The human calnuc protein contains 461 amino acids and has a pI of 4.9.

The protein contains the following regions and domains:

- Signal peptide
- Leucine-zipper The leucine-zipper of calnuc may be responsible for its dimerization.
- aa 347-389 – Nuclear localization signal
- 2 zinc binding sites with high affinity (K_{d} = 20 nM)
- carboxypeptidase-like motifs : HFREXnH (aa 66) and HFTEXnH (aa 146)
- 2 EF-hands
- Potential anchor region– 15-aa hydrophobic region at its COOH terminus that may be sufficient for membrane anchoring
