= Troponin C =

Protein family

Troponin C, slow skeletal and cardiac muscles

Identifiers
- Symbol: TNNC1
- HGNC: 11943
- OMIM: 191040
- RefSeq: NM_003280
- UniProt: P63316

Other data
- Locus: Chr. 3 p21.1
Search for
- Structures: Swiss-model
- Domains: InterPro

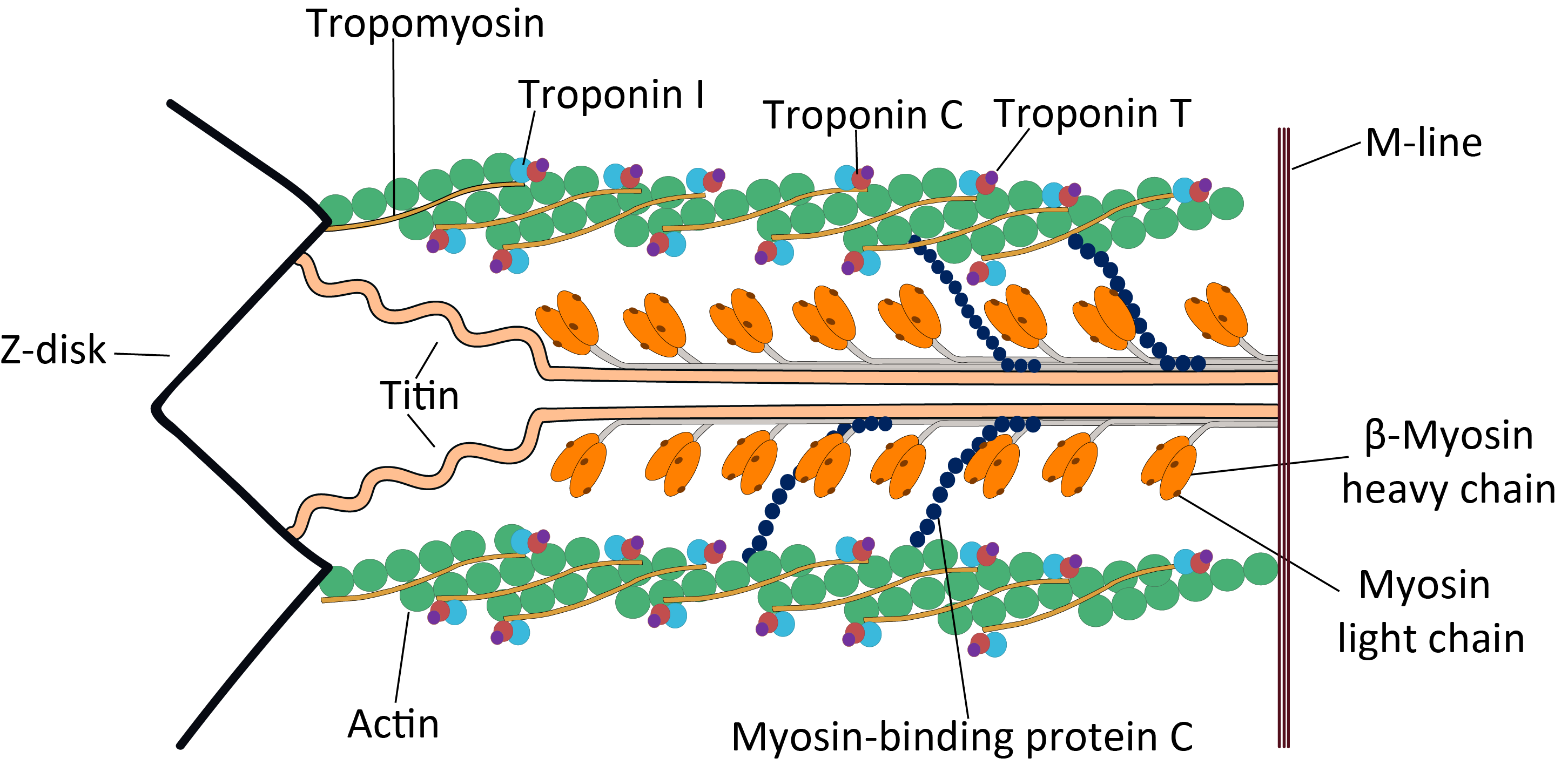
Cardiac sarcomere structure, featuring troponin C

Troponin

Troponin C (TnC) is part of the troponin protein complex. There are two subtypes in humans:

- Troponin C, slow skeletal and cardiac muscles (TNNC1) (3p21.1 Online Mendelian Inheritance in Man (OMIM): 191040)
- Troponin C, skeletal muscle (TNNC2) (20q12-q13.11, Online Mendelian Inheritance in Man (OMIM): 191039)

It contains four calcium-binding EF hands, although different isoforms may have fewer than four functional calcium-binding subdomains. It is a component of thin filaments, along with actin and tropomyosin. It contains an N lobe and a C lobe. The C lobe serves a structural purpose and binds to the N domain of troponin I (TnI). The C lobe can bind either Ca^{2+} or Mg^{2+}. The N lobe, which binds only Ca^{2+}, is the regulatory lobe and binds to the C domain of troponin I after calcium binding.

TnC is structurally similar to calmodulin and myosin light chain. These three groups of proteins form a family.

Troponin C, skeletal muscle

Identifiers
- Symbol: TNNC2
- HGNC: 11944
- OMIM: 191039
- RefSeq: NP_003270.1
- UniProt: P02585

Other data
- Locus: Chr. 20 q13.12
Search for
- Structures: Swiss-model
- Domains: InterPro

== See also ==
- Troponin T
- Troponin I
- Calcium-binding protein
- Sliding filament model
