= NECAB3 =

Protein-coding gene in the species Homo sapiens

Identifiers
- Aliases: NECAB3, APBA2BP, EFCBP3, NIP1, STIP3, SYTIP2, XB51, dJ63M2.4, dJ63M2.5, N-terminal EF-hand calcium binding protein 3
- External IDs: OMIM: 612478; MGI: 1861721; GeneCards: NECAB3

Gene location (Human)
Chr.	Chromosome 20 (human)
Band	20q11.22	Start	33,657,087 bp
Band	20q11.22	End	33,674,463 bp

Gene location (Mouse)
Chr.	Chromosome 2 (mouse)
Band	2|2 H1	Start	154,386,319 bp
Band	2|2 H1	End	154,400,810 bp
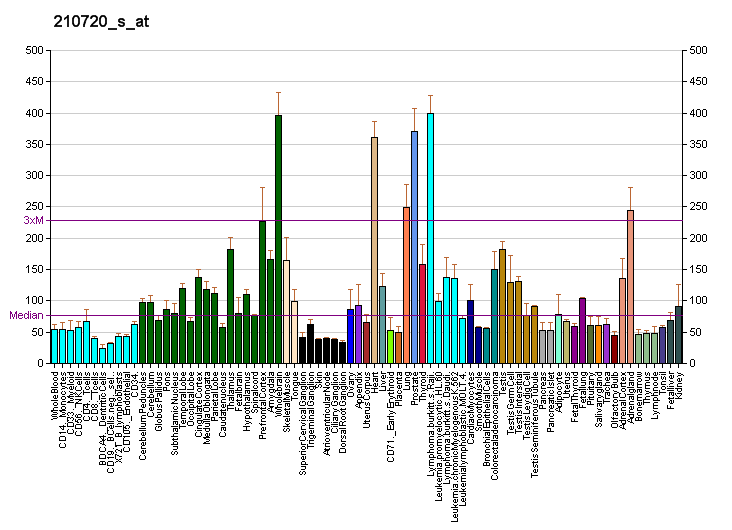
RNA expression pattern
Bgee	Human / Mouse (ortholog); Top expressed in: right adrenal cortex; left adrenal cortex; left ovary; right ovary; muscle of thigh; apex of heart; gastric mucosa; gastrocnemius muscle; body of stomach; right lobe of thyroid gland / Top expressed in: habenula; superior frontal gyrus; primary visual cortex; spermatid; dentate gyrus of hippocampal formation granule cell; lumbar spinal ganglion; embryo; prefrontal cortex; anterior horn of spinal cord; cerebellar cortex; More reference expression data
BioGPS	More reference expression data
Gene ontology
Molecular function	calcium ion binding; protein binding; metal ion binding
Cellular component	nucleus; cytoplasm; endoplasmic reticulum membrane; endoplasmic reticulum; Golgi cis cisterna; Golgi apparatus
Biological process	protein secretion; protein metabolic process; regulation of amyloid precursor protein biosynthetic process
Sources:Amigo / QuickGO
Orthologs
Databases	NCBI: entry; OMA: entry
Species	Human	Mouse
Entrez	63941	56846
Ensembl	ENSG00000125967	ENSMUSG00000027489
UniProt	Q96P71	Q9D6J4
RefSeq (mRNA)	NM_031231; NM_031232	NM_021546; NM_001379147; NM_001379148; NM_001379149
RefSeq (protein)	NP_112508; NP_112509	NP_067521; NP_001366076; NP_001366077; NP_001366078
Location (UCSC)	Chr 20: 33.66 – 33.67 Mb	Chr 2: 154.39 – 154.4 Mb
PubMed search
- Wikidata
View/Edit Human	View/Edit Mouse

N-terminal EF-hand calcium-binding protein 3 is a protein that in humans is encoded by the NECAB3 gene.

The protein encoded by this gene interacts with the amino-terminal domain of the amyloid beta A4 precursor protein-binding family A member 2 (APBA2), inhibits the association of APBA2 with amyloid precursor protein through a non-competitive mechanism, and abolishes the suppression of beta-amyloid production by APBA2. This protein, together with APBA2, may play an important role in the regulatory system of amyloid precursor protein metabolism and beta-amyloid generation. This gene consists of at least 13 exons and its alternative splicing generates at least 2 transcript variants.

== See also ==
- N-terminal
- EF-hand
