= ZZEF1 =

Protein in humans

Identifiers
- Aliases: ZZEF1, ZZZ4, zinc finger ZZ-type and EF-hand domain containing 1
- External IDs: MGI: 2444286; GeneCards: ZZEF1

Gene location (Human)
Chr.	Chromosome 17 (human)
Band	17p13.2	Start	4,004,445 bp
Band	17p13.2	End	4,143,030 bp

Gene location (Mouse)
Chr.	Chromosome 11 (mouse)
Band	11|11 B4	Start	72,687,052 bp
Band	11|11 B4	End	72,817,946 bp
RNA expression pattern
Bgee	Human / Mouse (ortholog); Top expressed in: jejunal mucosa; sural nerve; epithelium of colon; mucosa of ileum; transverse colon; gastric mucosa; mucosa of colon; mucosa of sigmoid colon; sperm; duodenum / Top expressed in: Rostral migratory stream; otolith organ; jejunum; utricle; superior cervical ganglion; ileum; granulocyte; Paneth cell; duodenum; epithelium of stomach; More reference expression data
BioGPS	n/a
Orthologs
Databases	NCBI: entry; OMA: entry
Species	Human	Mouse
Entrez	23140	195018
Ensembl	ENSG00000074755	ENSMUSG00000055670
UniProt	O43149	Q5SSH7
RefSeq (mRNA)	NM_015113	NM_001045536
RefSeq (protein)	NP_055928	NP_001039001
Location (UCSC)	Chr 17: 4 – 4.14 Mb	Chr 11: 72.69 – 72.82 Mb
PubMed search
- Wikidata
View/Edit Human	View/Edit Mouse

Zinc finger ZZ-type and EF-hand domain-containing protein 1 is a protein that in humans is encoded by the gene ZZEF1. It is found in both laboratory mice and humans.
