= TBC1D9 =

Protein-coding gene in the species Homo sapiens

Identifiers
- Aliases: TBC1D9, MDR1, GRAMD9, TBC1 domain family member 9
- External IDs: OMIM: 618035; MGI: 1918560; GeneCards: TBC1D9

Gene location (Human)
Chr.	Chromosome 4 (human)
Band	4q31.21	Start	140,620,782 bp
Band	4q31.21	End	140,756,385 bp

Gene location (Mouse)
Chr.	Chromosome 8 (mouse)
Band	8|8 C2	Start	83,891,981 bp
Band	8|8 C2	End	83,999,563 bp
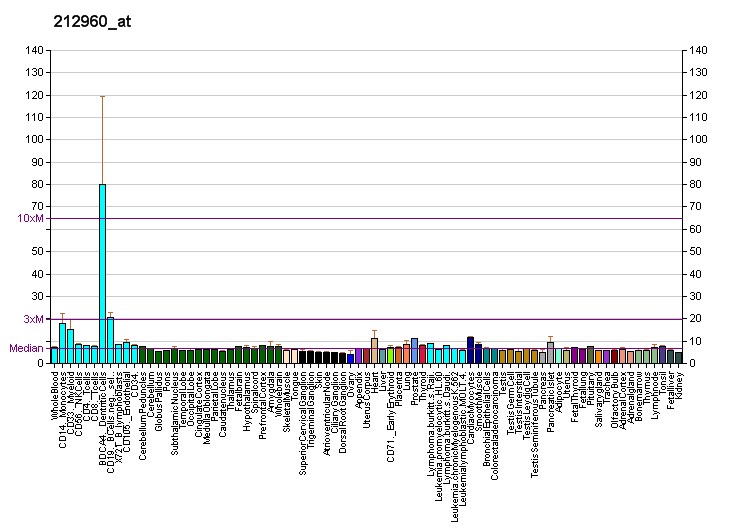

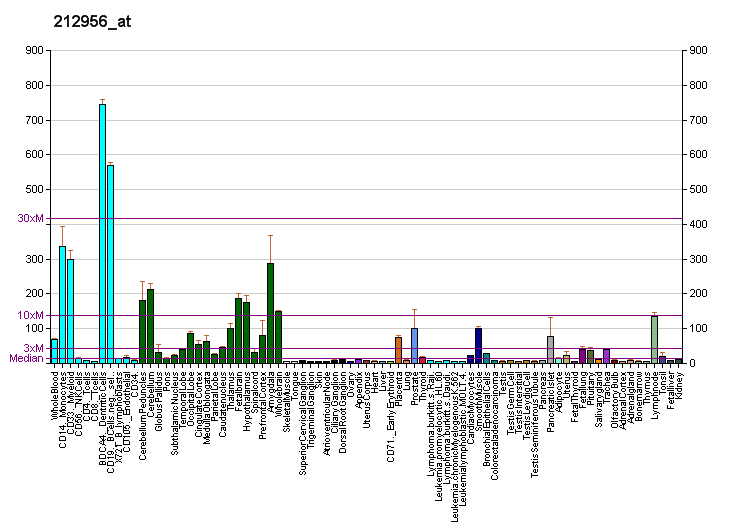
RNA expression pattern
Bgee	Human / Mouse (ortholog); Top expressed in: lactiferous duct; Epithelium of choroid plexus; palpebral conjunctiva; lateral nuclear group of thalamus; seminal vesicula; visceral pleura; spinal ganglia; parietal pleura; pons; trigeminal ganglion / Top expressed in: Epithelium of choroid plexus; trigeminal ganglion; superior cervical ganglion; cerebellar cortex; ventral tegmental area; lobe of cerebellum; visual cortex; transitional epithelium of urinary bladder; primary visual cortex; pontine nuclei; More reference expression data
BioGPS	More reference expression data
Gene ontology
Molecular function	protein binding; calcium ion binding; GTPase activator activity
Cellular component	endomembrane system; intracellular anatomical structure
Biological process	activation of GTPase activity; regulation of vesicle fusion; intracellular protein transport
Sources:Amigo / QuickGO
Orthologs
Databases	NCBI: entry; OMA: entry
Species	Human	Mouse
Entrez	23158	71310
Ensembl	ENSG00000109436	ENSMUSG00000031709
UniProt	Q6ZT07	Q3UYK3
RefSeq (mRNA)	NM_015130	NM_001111304; NM_027758
RefSeq (protein)	NP_055945	NP_001104774; NP_082034
Location (UCSC)	Chr 4: 140.62 – 140.76 Mb	Chr 8: 83.89 – 84 Mb
PubMed search
- Wikidata
View/Edit Human	View/Edit Mouse

TBC1 domain family member 9 is a protein that in humans is encoded by the TBC1D9 gene.

It is also known as MDR1, GRAMD9.

It is predicted to enable GTPase activator activity. It is also predicted to be involved in activation of GTPase activity and intracellular protein transport.
