= Troponin C, skeletal muscle =

Protein-coding gene in the species Homo sapiens

TNNC2

Identifiers
- Aliases: TNNC2, troponin C2, fast skeletal type, CFAP85, FAP85
- External IDs: OMIM: 191039; MGI: 98780; GeneCards: TNNC2

Gene location (Human)
Chr.	Chromosome 20 (human)
Band	20q13.12	Start	45,823,214 bp
Band	20q13.12	End	45,833,745 bp

Gene location (Mouse)
Chr.	Chromosome 2 (mouse)
Band	2|2 H3	Start	164,619,081 bp
Band	2|2 H3	End	164,621,887 bp
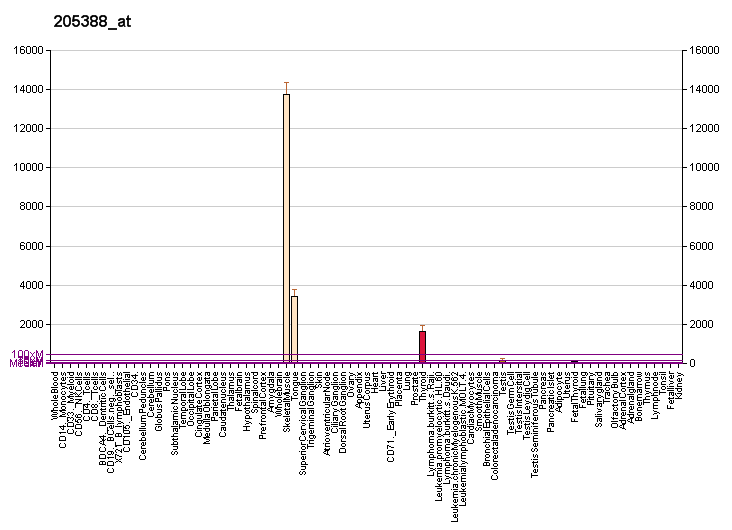
RNA expression pattern
Bgee	Human / Mouse (ortholog); Top expressed in: Skeletal muscle tissue of rectus abdominis; muscle of thigh; gastrocnemius muscle; thoracic diaphragm; quadriceps femoris muscle; vastus lateralis muscle; Skeletal muscle tissue of biceps brachii; body of tongue; triceps brachii muscle; deltoid muscle / Top expressed in: intercostal muscle; soleus muscle; medial head of gastrocnemius muscle; masseter muscle; tibialis anterior muscle; body of femur; thoracic diaphragm; skeletal muscle tissue; muscle of thigh; ankle; More reference expression data
BioGPS	More reference expression data
Gene ontology
Molecular function	actin binding; protein binding; metal ion binding; calcium-dependent protein binding; actin filament binding; calcium ion binding
Cellular component	cytosol; troponin complex
Biological process	regulation of muscle contraction; skeletal muscle contraction; muscle filament sliding
Sources:Amigo / QuickGO
Orthologs
Databases	NCBI: entry; OMA: entry
Species	Human	Mouse
Entrez	7125	21925
Ensembl	ENSG00000101470	ENSMUSG00000017300
UniProt	P02585	P20801
RefSeq (mRNA)	NM_003279	NM_009394
RefSeq (protein)	NP_003270	NP_033420
Location (UCSC)	Chr 20: 45.82 – 45.83 Mb	Chr 2: 164.62 – 164.62 Mb
PubMed search
- Wikidata
View/Edit Human	View/Edit Mouse

Troponin C, skeletal muscle (sTnC) is a protein that in humans is encoded by the TNNC2 gene. It is the troponin C paralog expressed in fast-twitching fibers of skeletal muscle.

Troponin (Tn), is a key protein complex in the regulation of striated muscle contraction, composed of three subunits. The TnI subunit inhibits actomyosin ATPase, the TnT subunit binds tropomyosin and TnC, while the TnC subunit binds calcium and overcomes the inhibitory action of the troponin complex on actin thin filaments. The protein encoded by the TNNC2 gene is the TnC subunit.

There are already multiple troponin activators that bind to fast skeletal troponin C, of which tirasemtiv has been tested in multiple clinical trials.
