= REPS1 =

Protein-coding gene in the species Homo sapiens

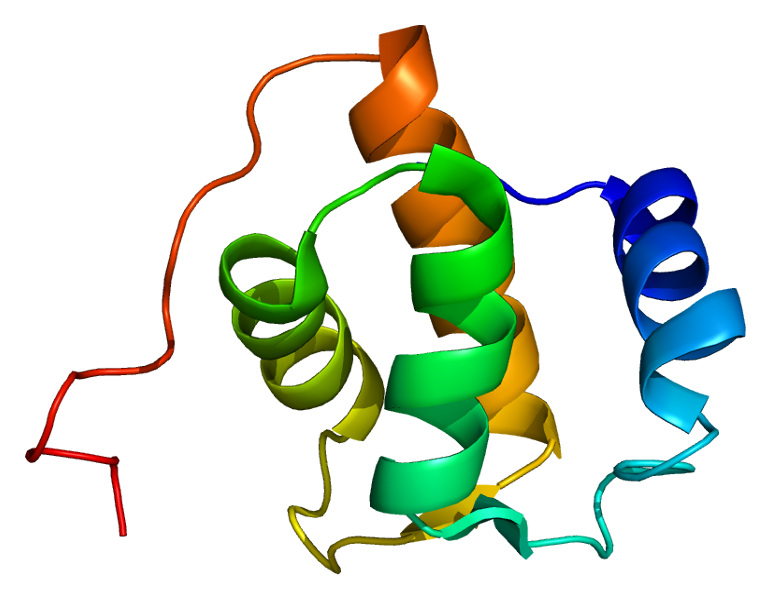

Identifiers
- Aliases: REPS1, RALBP1, RALBP1 associated Eps domain containing 1, NBIA7
- External IDs: OMIM: 614825; MGI: 1196373; GeneCards: REPS1

Gene location (Human)
Chr.	Chromosome 6 (human)
Band	6q24.1	Start	138,903,493 bp
Band	6q24.1	End	138,988,261 bp

Gene location (Mouse)
Chr.	Chromosome 10 (mouse)
Band	10|10 A3	Start	17,931,609 bp
Band	10|10 A3	End	18,000,903 bp
RNA expression pattern
Bgee	Human / Mouse (ortholog); Top expressed in: ventricular zone; right uterine tube; parotid gland; olfactory zone of nasal mucosa; anterior pituitary; ganglionic eminence; right hemisphere of cerebellum; Brodmann area 9; skin of abdomen; right frontal lobe / Top expressed in: genital tubercle; tail of embryo; secondary oocyte; zygote; submandibular gland; spermatocyte; gastrula; primary oocyte; Rostral migratory stream; seminal vesicula; More reference expression data
BioGPS	n/a
Gene ontology
Molecular function	calcium ion binding; SH3 domain binding; protein binding; metal ion binding
Cellular component	membrane; plasma membrane; clathrin-coated pit; cytosol
Biological process	receptor-mediated endocytosis; membrane organization
Sources:Amigo / QuickGO
Orthologs
Databases	NCBI: entry; OMA: entry
Species	Human	Mouse
Entrez	85021	19707
Ensembl	ENSG00000135597	ENSMUSG00000019854
UniProt	Q96D71	O54916
RefSeq (mRNA)	NM_001128617; NM_001286611; NM_001286612; NM_031922	NM_001111065; NM_009048
RefSeq (protein)	NP_001122089; NP_001273540; NP_001273541; NP_114128	NP_001104535; NP_033074
Location (UCSC)	Chr 6: 138.9 – 138.99 Mb	Chr 10: 17.93 – 18 Mb
PubMed search
- Wikidata
View/Edit Human	View/Edit Mouse

RalBP1-associated Eps domain-containing protein 1 is a protein that in humans is encoded by the REPS1 gene.
