= Reticulocalbin 1 =

Protein-coding gene in the species Homo sapiens

RCN1

Identifiers
- Aliases: RCN1, HEL-S-84, PIG20, RCAL, RCN, reticulocalbin 1
- External IDs: OMIM: 602735; MGI: 104559; GeneCards: RCN1

Gene location (Human)
Chr.	Chromosome 11 (human)
Band	11p13	Start	32,091,074 bp
Band	11p13	End	32,105,722 bp

Gene location (Mouse)
Chr.	Chromosome 2 (mouse)
Band	2 E3|2 55.18 cM	Start	105,216,636 bp
Band	2 E3|2 55.18 cM	End	105,229,664 bp
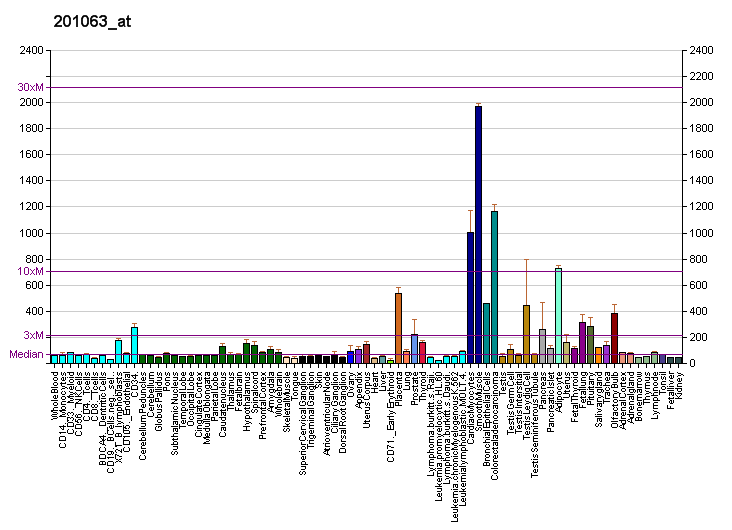
RNA expression pattern
Bgee	Human / Mouse (ortholog); Top expressed in: corpus epididymis; stromal cell of endometrium; ventricular zone; cartilage tissue; periodontal fiber; seminal vesicula; tendon of biceps brachii; right coronary artery; tibia; caput epididymis / Top expressed in: seminal vesicula; vestibular sensory epithelium; gastrula; parotid gland; umbilical cord; dermis; utricle; atrium; human fetus; calvaria; More reference expression data
BioGPS	More reference expression data
Gene ontology
Molecular function	calcium ion binding; protein binding; metal ion binding
Cellular component	endoplasmic reticulum lumen; endoplasmic reticulum
Biological process	post-translational protein modification; in utero embryonic development; camera-type eye development
Sources:Amigo / QuickGO
Orthologs
Databases	NCBI: entry; OMA: entry
Species	Human	Mouse
Entrez	5954	19672
Ensembl	ENSG00000049449	ENSMUSG00000005973
UniProt	Q15293	Q05186
RefSeq (mRNA)	NM_002901	NM_009037
RefSeq (protein)	NP_002892	NP_033063
Location (UCSC)	Chr 11: 32.09 – 32.11 Mb	Chr 2: 105.22 – 105.23 Mb
PubMed search
- Wikidata
View/Edit Human	View/Edit Mouse

Reticulocalbin-1 is a protein that in humans is encoded by the RCN1 gene.

Reticulocalbin 1 is a calcium-binding protein located in the lumen of the ER. The protein contains six conserved regions with similarity to a high affinity Ca(+2)-binding motif, the EF-hand. High conservation of amino acid residues outside of these motifs, in comparison to mouse reticulocalbin, is consistent with a possible biochemical function besides that of calcium binding.
