= GUCA1A =

Protein-coding gene in the species Homo sapiens

Identifiers
- Aliases: GUCA1A, C6orf131, COD3, CORD14, GCAP, GCAP1, GUCA, GUCA1, dJ139D8.6, guanylate cyclase activator 1A, GUCA1ANB-GUCA1A readthrough, GUCA1ANB-LOC118142757
- External IDs: OMIM: 600364; MGI: 1922712; GeneCards: GUCA1A

Gene location (Mouse)
Chr.	Chromosome 17 (mouse)
Band	17|17 C	Start	47,723,659 bp
Band	17|17 C	End	47,748,301 bp
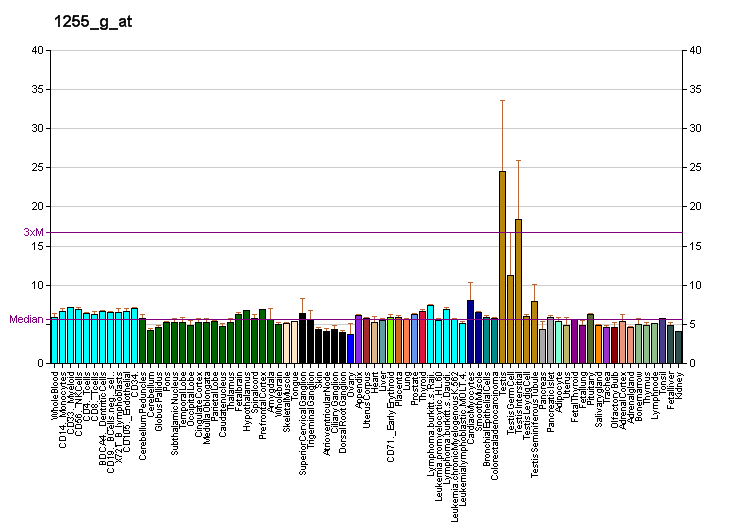

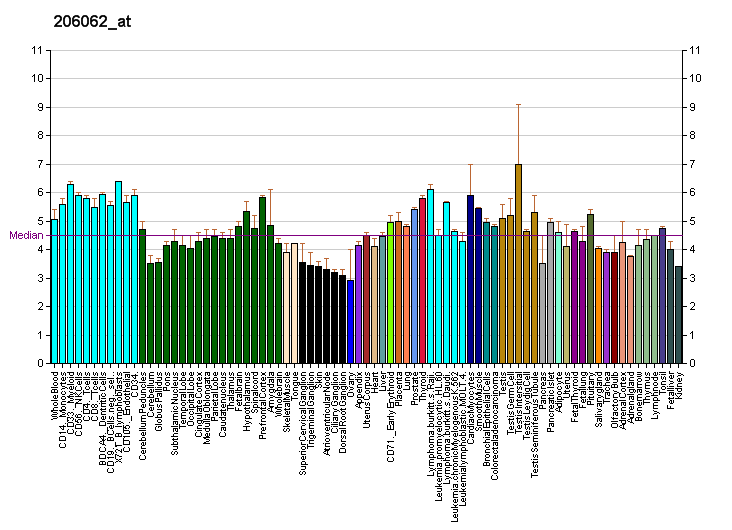
RNA expression pattern
Bgee	Human / Mouse (ortholog); n/a / Top expressed in: testicle; spermatid; liver; embryo; spermatocyte; placenta; islet of Langerhans; duodenum; morula; esophagus
BioGPS	More reference expression data
Gene ontology
Molecular function	calcium ion binding; guanylate cyclase regulator activity; metal ion binding; calcium sensitive guanylate cyclase activator activity
Cellular component	photoreceptor inner segment; membrane; photoreceptor outer segment; photoreceptor disc membrane
Biological process	cellular response to calcium ion; phototransduction; response to stimulus; positive regulation of guanylate cyclase activity; regulation of guanylate cyclase activity; signal transduction; visual perception; regulation of rhodopsin mediated signaling pathway; positive regulation of cGMP-mediated signaling
Sources:Amigo / QuickGO
Orthologs
Databases	NCBI: entry; OMA: entry
Species	Human	Mouse
Entrez	118142757	75462
Ensembl	ENSG00000048545	ENSMUSG00000047150
UniProt	P43080	n/a
RefSeq (mRNA)	NM_000409; NM_001319061; NM_001319062	NM_001172091; NM_029296; NM_001347584
RefSeq (protein)	NP_000400; NP_001305990; NP_001305991	n/a
Location (UCSC)	n/a	Chr 17: 47.72 – 47.75 Mb
PubMed search
- Wikidata
View/Edit Human	View/Edit Mouse

Guanylyl cyclase-activating protein 1 is an enzyme that in humans is encoded by the GUCA1A gene.
