= MYL1 =

Protein-coding gene in the species Homo sapiens

Identifiers
- Aliases: MYL1, MLC1F, MLC3F, myosin light chain 1, MYOFTA, MLC1, MLC1/3, MLC-1
- External IDs: OMIM: 160780; MGI: 97269; GeneCards: MYL1

Gene location (Human)
Chr.	Chromosome 2 (human)
Band	2q34	Start	210,290,150 bp
Band	2q34	End	210,315,174 bp

Gene location (Mouse)
Chr.	Chromosome 1 (mouse)
Band	1 C3|1 33.71 cM	Start	66,963,454 bp
Band	1 C3|1 33.71 cM	End	66,984,563 bp
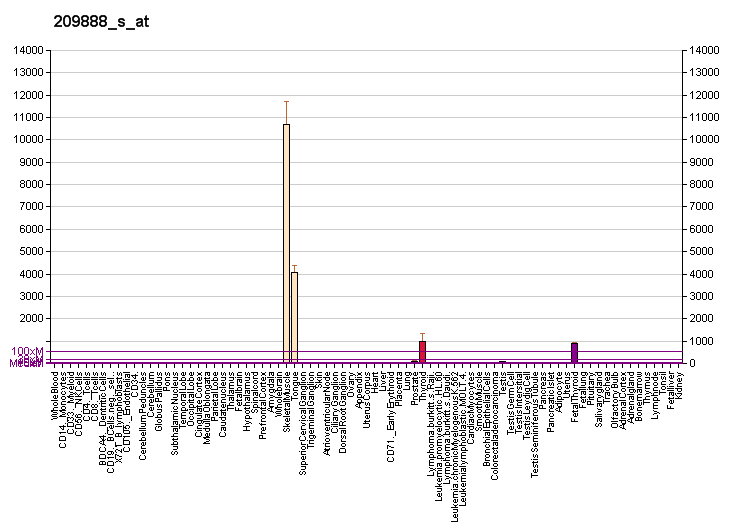
RNA expression pattern
Bgee	Human / Mouse (ortholog); Top expressed in: Skeletal muscle tissue of biceps brachii; Skeletal muscle tissue of rectus abdominis; body of tongue; gastrocnemius muscle; triceps brachii muscle; muscle of thigh; tibialis anterior muscle; thoracic diaphragm; quadriceps femoris muscle; vastus lateralis muscle / Top expressed in: quadriceps femoris muscle; skeletal muscle tissue; muscle of thigh; zone of skin; esophagus; lip; white adipose tissue; synovial joint; ankle joint; heart; More reference expression data
BioGPS	More reference expression data
Gene ontology
Molecular function	calcium ion binding; structural constituent of muscle
Cellular component	contractile fiber; cytosol; muscle myosin complex; myofibril; sarcomere; myosin complex
Biological process	muscle contraction; cardiac muscle contraction; muscle filament sliding
Sources:Amigo / QuickGO
Orthologs
Databases	NCBI: entry; OMA: entry
Species	Human	Mouse
Entrez	4632	17901
Ensembl	ENSG00000168530	ENSMUSG00000061816
UniProt	P05976	P05977
RefSeq (mRNA)	NM_079422; NM_079420	NM_001113387; NM_021285
RefSeq (protein)	NP_524144; NP_524146	NP_001106858; NP_067260
Location (UCSC)	Chr 2: 210.29 – 210.32 Mb	Chr 1: 66.96 – 66.98 Mb
PubMed search
- Wikidata
View/Edit Human	View/Edit Mouse

Myosin light chain 3, skeletal muscle isoform is a protein that in humans is encoded by the MYL1 gene.

Myosin is a hexameric ATPase cellular motor protein. It is composed of two heavy chains, two nonphosphorylatable alkali light chains, and two phosphorylatable regulatory light chains. This gene encodes a myosin alkali light chain expressed in fast skeletal muscle. Two transcript variants have been identified for this gene.
