= Secretagogin =

Protein-coding gene in the species Homo sapiens

SCGN

Identifiers
- Aliases: SCGN, CALBL, DJ501N12.8, SECRET, SEGN, setagin, secretagogin, EF-hand calcium binding protein
- External IDs: OMIM: 609202; MGI: 2384873; GeneCards: SCGN

Gene location (Human)
Chr.	Chromosome 6 (human)
Band	6p22.2	Start	25,652,201 bp
Band	6p22.2	End	25,701,783 bp

Gene location (Mouse)
Chr.	Chromosome 13 (mouse)
Band	13|13 A3.1	Start	24,137,439 bp
Band	13|13 A3.1	End	24,175,197 bp
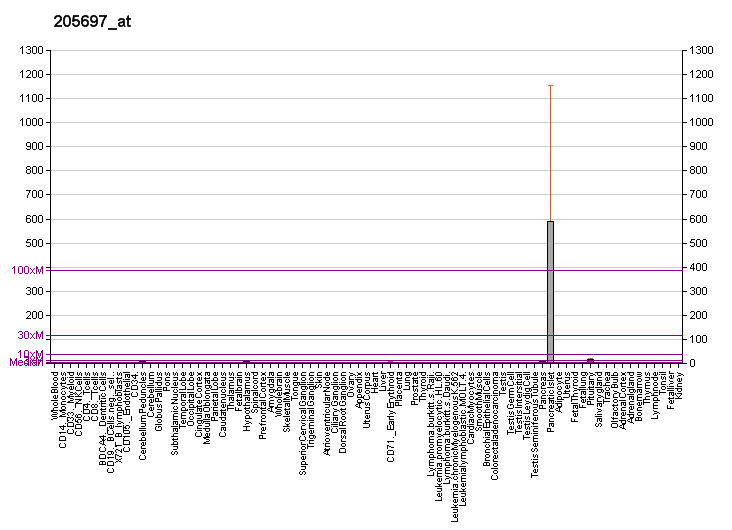
RNA expression pattern
Bgee	Human / Mouse (ortholog); Top expressed in: islet of Langerhans; beta cell; body of pancreas; testicle; rectum; pituitary gland; cerebellar cortex; cerebellar hemisphere; right hemisphere of cerebellum; anterior pituitary / Top expressed in: islet of Langerhans; neural layer of retina; olfactory epithelium; spermatid; lens; embryo; olfactory bulb; lumbar spinal ganglion; seminiferous tubule; embryo; More reference expression data
BioGPS	More reference expression data
Gene ontology
Molecular function	calcium ion binding; metal ion binding
Cellular component	cytoplasm; extracellular region; neuron projection; cytosol; transport vesicle membrane; synapse; membrane; cytoplasmic vesicle; nucleus; dendrite; presynapse
Biological process	regulation of cytosolic calcium ion concentration; biological process; regulation of presynaptic cytosolic calcium ion concentration; regulation of long-term synaptic potentiation
Sources:Amigo / QuickGO
Orthologs
Databases	NCBI: entry; OMA: entry
Species	Human	Mouse
Entrez	10590	214189
Ensembl	ENSG00000079689	ENSMUSG00000021337
UniProt	O76038	Q91WD9
RefSeq (mRNA)	NM_006998	NM_145399
RefSeq (protein)	NP_008929	NP_663374
Location (UCSC)	Chr 6: 25.65 – 25.7 Mb	Chr 13: 24.14 – 24.18 Mb
PubMed search
- Wikidata
View/Edit Human	View/Edit Mouse

Secretagogin is a protein that in humans is encoded by the SCGN gene.

== Expression ==
Secretagogin is expressed in a variety of organs and tissues. It is expressed in pancreatic β cells, where it participates in insulin release. In the brain, it is expressed in interneurons and pyramidal cells of the hippocampus. In the brainstem, it is expressed neurons of the superior colliculus, cuneiform nucleus, locus coeruleus, and solitary tract nucleus. In the spinal cord, secretagogin is expressed in the dorsal horn and dorsal root ganglia (up to 7% of DRGs) where it is co-expressed with calcitonin gene-related peptide (CGRP). Secretagogin is also expressed in the sciatic nerve. In gut tissue, secretagogin is expressed in 10% of enteric neurons of the small intestine, while it is expressed in 5% of enteric neurons of the proximal colon, and 25% in the distal colon. Single-cell RNA sequencing of human and mouse intestinal tissue suggests that secretagogin is also expressed in about 15% of enteroendocrine cells.

There are notable differences in secretagogin expression between mice and humans, particularly in the brain. For example, secretagogin is most highly expressed in the cerebellum of humans, while in mice the olfactory bulb has the most secretagogin-expressing neurons.

== Function ==
The encoded protein is a secreted calcium-binding protein which is found in the cytoplasm. It is related to calbindin D-28K and calretinin. This protein is thought to be involved in potassium chloride-stimulated calcium flux and cell proliferation. This protein plays an important role in the release of the stress hormone Corticotropin-releasing hormone (CRH) and which only then enables stress processes in the brain.

Within pancreatic β cells, secretagogin assists in insulin release, particularly in scaling insulin release to glucose levels. It does this by interacting with the actin cytoskeleton and synaptic release machinery such as SNAP-25. Deletion of secretagogin disrupts the membrane-specific localization of SNAP-25, suggesting that secretagogin is critical for the assembly of synaptic release machinery.

In human fetal brain development, secretagogin is expressed in neocortical GABAergic neurons that migrate from the central and lateral ganglionic eminences. Secretagogin expression in these populations is highest right before birth, and wanes into adulthood. When secretagogin was overexpressed in embryonic neurons, their total neurite length and the number of branches increased, suggesting that secretagogin may play a role in neuronal arborization.
