= EFHD2 =

Protein-coding gene in humans

Identifiers
- Aliases: EFHD2, SWS1, EF-hand domain family member D2
- External IDs: OMIM: 616450; MGI: 106504; GeneCards: EFHD2

Gene location (Human)
Chr.	Chromosome 1 (human)
Band	1p36.21	Start	15,409,888 bp
Band	1p36.21	End	15,430,339 bp

Gene location (Mouse)
Chr.	Chromosome 4 (mouse)
Band	4 D3|4 74.75 cM	Start	141,585,453 bp
Band	4 D3|4 74.75 cM	End	141,602,231 bp
RNA expression pattern
Bgee	Human / Mouse (ortholog); Top expressed in: granulocyte; monocyte; blood; mucosa of transverse colon; pons; left testis; right testis; spleen; anterior cingulate cortex; palpebral conjunctiva / Top expressed in: Paneth cell; ciliary body; mesenteric lymph nodes; stroma of bone marrow; retinal pigment epithelium; iris; endothelial cell of lymphatic vessel; left colon; epithelium of stomach; conjunctival fornix; More reference expression data
BioGPS	n/a
Gene ontology
Molecular function	metal ion binding; calcium ion binding; cadherin binding
Cellular component	membrane; membrane raft
Biological process	cell-cell adhesion
Sources:Amigo / QuickGO
Orthologs
Databases	NCBI: entry; OMA: entry
Species	Human	Mouse
Entrez	79180	27984
Ensembl	ENSG00000142634	ENSMUSG00000040659
UniProt	Q96C19	Q9D8Y0; Q8C845
RefSeq (mRNA)	NM_024329	NM_025994
RefSeq (protein)	NP_077305	NP_080270
Location (UCSC)	Chr 1: 15.41 – 15.43 Mb	Chr 4: 141.59 – 141.6 Mb
PubMed search
- Wikidata
View/Edit Human	View/Edit Mouse

EF-hand domain family member D2 is a protein that in humans is encoded by the EFHD2 gene.
