= FKBP9 =

Protein-coding gene in the species Homo sapiens

Identifiers
- Aliases: FKBP9, FKBP60, FKBP63, PPIase, FK506 binding protein 9, FKBP prolyl isomerase 9
- External IDs: OMIM: 616257; MGI: 1350921; GeneCards: FKBP9
Enzyme activity
EC #	BRENDA	ExPASy	KEGG	MetaCyc
5.2.1.8	↗	↗	↗	↗

Gene location (Human)
Chr.	Chromosome 7 (human)
Band	7p14.3	Start	32,957,404 bp
Band	7p14.3	End	33,006,930 bp

Gene location (Mouse)
Chr.	Chromosome 6 (mouse)
Band	6 B3|6 27.74 cM	Start	56,809,044 bp
Band	6 B3|6 27.74 cM	End	56,856,343 bp
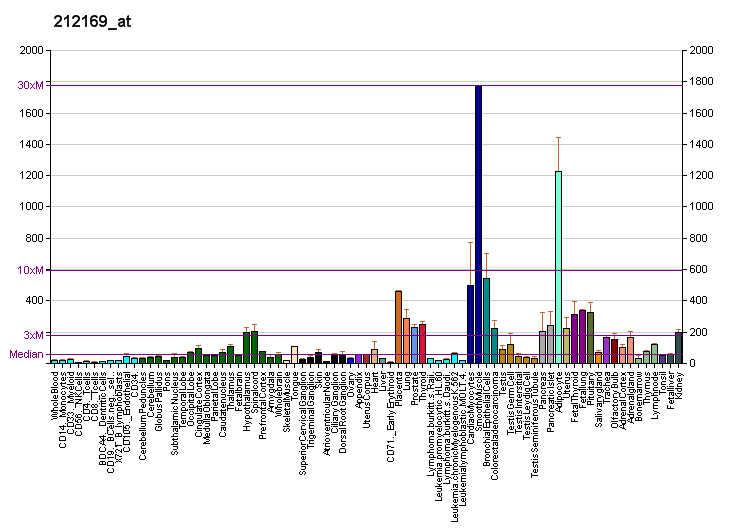
RNA expression pattern
Bgee	Human / Mouse (ortholog); Top expressed in: stromal cell of endometrium; epithelium of colon; Achilles tendon; smooth muscle tissue; placenta; gallbladder; Descending thoracic aorta; subcutaneous adipose tissue; ascending aorta; right coronary artery / Top expressed in: vestibular sensory epithelium; vestibular membrane of cochlear duct; iris; ciliary body; utricle; calvaria; Epithelium of choroid plexus; molar; vas deferens; fossa; More reference expression data
BioGPS	More reference expression data
Gene ontology
Molecular function	calcium ion binding; FK506 binding; isomerase activity; peptidyl-prolyl cis-trans isomerase activity; metal ion binding
Cellular component	endoplasmic reticulum; cytoplasm
Biological process	protein folding; chaperone-mediated protein folding; protein peptidyl-prolyl isomerization
Sources:Amigo / QuickGO
Orthologs
Databases	NCBI: entry; OMA: entry
Species	Human	Mouse
Entrez	11328	27055
Ensembl	ENSG00000122642	ENSMUSG00000029781
UniProt	O95302	Q9Z247
RefSeq (mRNA)	NM_001284341; NM_001284343; NM_007270	NM_012056
RefSeq (protein)	NP_001271270; NP_001271272; NP_009201	NP_036186
Location (UCSC)	Chr 7: 32.96 – 33.01 Mb	Chr 6: 56.81 – 56.86 Mb
PubMed search
- Wikidata
View/Edit Human	View/Edit Mouse

FK506-binding protein 9 is a protein that in humans is encoded by the FKBP9 gene.
