= NECAB2 =

Protein-coding gene in the species Homo sapiens

Identifiers
- Aliases: NECAB2, EFCBP2, N-terminal EF-hand calcium binding protein 2, stip-2
- External IDs: OMIM: 618130; MGI: 2152211; GeneCards: NECAB2

Gene location (Human)
Chr.	Chromosome 16 (human)
Band	16q23.3	Start	83,968,244 bp
Band	16q23.3	End	84,002,776 bp

Gene location (Mouse)
Chr.	Chromosome 8 (mouse)
Band	8|8 E1	Start	120,173,458 bp
Band	8|8 E1	End	120,199,379 bp
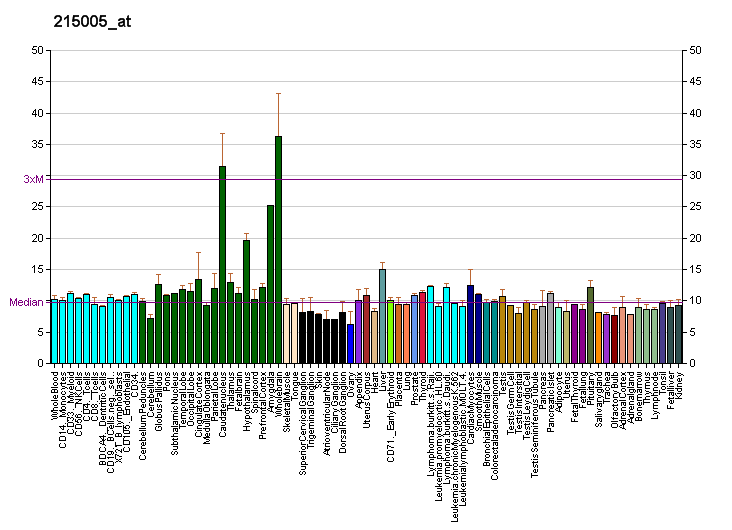
RNA expression pattern
Bgee	Human / Mouse (ortholog); Top expressed in: nucleus accumbens; caudate nucleus; amygdala; putamen; cingulate gyrus; anterior cingulate cortex; right frontal lobe; Brodmann area 9; hypothalamus; prefrontal cortex / Top expressed in: habenula; olfactory tubercle; lateral septal nucleus; dentate gyrus of hippocampal formation granule cell; medial geniculate nucleus; anterior amygdaloid area; medial dorsal nucleus; subiculum; nucleus accumbens; globus pallidus; More reference expression data
BioGPS	More reference expression data
Gene ontology
Molecular function	metal ion binding; protein binding; calcium ion binding; A2A adenosine receptor binding; type 5 metabotropic glutamate receptor binding; identical protein binding
Cellular component	cytoplasm; plasma membrane; membrane; axon; dendrite; cell projection
Biological process	positive regulation of adenosine receptor signaling pathway; positive regulation of ERK1 and ERK2 cascade; positive regulation of glutamate receptor signaling pathway; negative regulation of G protein-coupled receptor internalization; positive regulation of protein localization to membrane; regulation of amyloid precursor protein biosynthetic process
Sources:Amigo / QuickGO
Orthologs
Databases	NCBI: entry; OMA: entry
Species	Human	Mouse
Entrez	54550	117148
Ensembl	ENSG00000103154	ENSMUSG00000031837
UniProt	Q7Z6G3	Q91ZP9
RefSeq (mRNA)	NM_019065; NM_001329748; NM_001329749	NM_054095
RefSeq (protein)	NP_001316677; NP_001316678; NP_061938	NP_473436
Location (UCSC)	Chr 16: 83.97 – 84 Mb	Chr 8: 120.17 – 120.2 Mb
PubMed search
- Wikidata
View/Edit Human	View/Edit Mouse

N-terminal EF-hand calcium-binding protein 2 is a protein that in humans is encoded by the NECAB2 gene.
