= Follistatin like 5 =

Protein

FSTL5

Identifiers
- Aliases: FSTL5, follistatin like 5
- External IDs: MGI: 2442179; GeneCards: FSTL5

Gene location (Human)
Chr.	Chromosome 4 (human)
Band	4q32.2	Start	161,383,897 bp
Band	4q32.2	End	162,164,004 bp

Gene location (Mouse)
Chr.	Chromosome 3 (mouse)
Band	3|3 E3	Start	75,981,577 bp
Band	3|3 E3	End	76,617,326 bp
RNA expression pattern
Bgee	Human / Mouse (ortholog); Top expressed in: cerebellar vermis; endothelial cell; pons; ventricular zone; cerebellar hemisphere; right hemisphere of cerebellum; superior vestibular nucleus; Brodmann area 23; ganglionic eminence; Brodmann area 46 / Top expressed in: olfactory epithelium; habenula; lateral hypothalamus; dorsomedial hypothalamic nucleus; dorsal tegmental nucleus; ventral tegmental area; superior colliculus; olfactory bulb; central gray substance of midbrain; mammillary body; More reference expression data
BioGPS	n/a
Orthologs
Databases	NCBI: entry; OMA: entry
Species	Human	Mouse
Entrez	56884	213262
Ensembl	ENSG00000168843	ENSMUSG00000034098
UniProt	Q8N475	Q8BFR2
RefSeq (mRNA)	NM_001128427; NM_001128428; NM_020116	NM_001253719; NM_178673
RefSeq (protein)	NP_001121899; NP_001121900; NP_064501	NP_001240648; NP_848788
Location (UCSC)	Chr 4: 161.38 – 162.16 Mb	Chr 3: 75.98 – 76.62 Mb
PubMed search
- Wikidata
View/Edit Human	View/Edit Mouse

Follistatin like 5 is a protein that in humans is encoded by the FSTL5 gene.
