= Myosin regulatory light chain 11 =

Protein found in humans

MYL11

Identifiers
- Aliases: MYL11, MYLPF, myosin light chain 11, HUMMLC2B, MLC2B, myosin light chain, phosphorylatable, fast skeletal muscle, MRLC2, DA1C
- External IDs: OMIM: 617378; MGI: 97273; GeneCards: MYL11

Gene location (Human)
Chr.	Chromosome 16 (human)
Band	16p11.2	Start	30,370,934 bp
Band	16p11.2	End	30,377,991 bp

Gene location (Mouse)
Chr.	Chromosome 7 (mouse)
Band	7|7 F3	Start	126,808,062 bp
Band	7|7 F3	End	126,813,470 bp
RNA expression pattern
Bgee	Human / Mouse (ortholog); Top expressed in: biceps brachii; Skeletal muscle tissue of biceps brachii; Skeletal muscle tissue of rectus abdominis; triceps brachii muscle; muscle of thigh; gastrocnemius muscle; vastus lateralis muscle; glutes; thoracic diaphragm; body of tongue / Top expressed in: temporal muscle; sternocleidomastoid muscle; triceps brachii muscle; digastric muscle; medial head of gastrocnemius muscle; muscle of thigh; vastus lateralis muscle; body of femur; intercostal muscle; ankle; More reference expression data
BioGPS	n/a
Gene ontology
Molecular function	calcium ion binding; structural constituent of muscle; metal ion binding
Cellular component	lysosomal membrane; cytosol; muscle myosin complex; myosin complex
Biological process	muscle contraction; skeletal muscle tissue development; immune response
Sources:Amigo / QuickGO
Orthologs
Databases	NCBI: entry; OMA: entry
Species	Human	Mouse
Entrez	29895	17907
Ensembl	ENSG00000180209	ENSMUSG00000030672
UniProt	Q96A32	P97457
RefSeq (mRNA)	NM_013292; NM_001324458; NM_001324459	NM_016754; NM_001347655
RefSeq (protein)	NP_001311387; NP_001311388; NP_037424	NP_001334584; NP_058034
Location (UCSC)	Chr 16: 30.37 – 30.38 Mb	Chr 7: 126.81 – 126.81 Mb
PubMed search
- Wikidata
View/Edit Human	View/Edit Mouse

Myosin regulatory light chain 11 is a protein that in humans is encoded by the MYL11 gene (previously MYLPF). Based on research on an ortholog in zebrafish, this protein is predicted to be a regulatory subunit for myosin which is involved in early muscle development, and to also be involved in muscle contraction.
