= SDF4 =

Protein-coding gene in humans

Identifiers
- Aliases: SDF4, Cab45, SDF-4, stromal cell derived factor 4
- External IDs: OMIM: 614282; MGI: 108079; GeneCards: SDF4

Gene location (Human)
Chr.	Chromosome 1 (human)
Band	1p36.33	Start	1,216,909 bp
Band	1p36.33	End	1,232,067 bp

Gene location (Mouse)
Chr.	Chromosome 4 (mouse)
Band	4|4 E2	Start	156,077,329 bp
Band	4|4 E2	End	156,098,067 bp
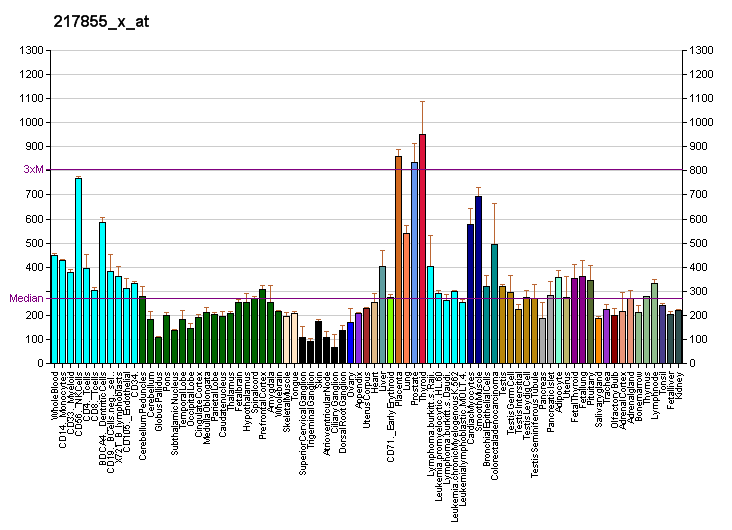

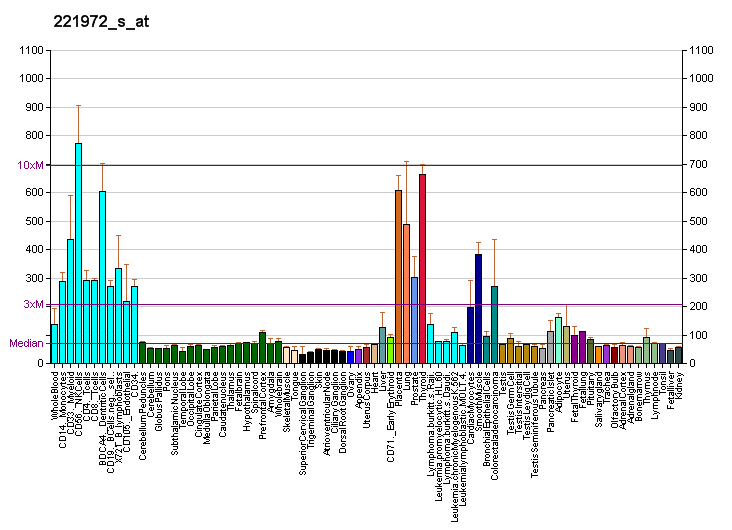
RNA expression pattern
Bgee	Human / Mouse (ortholog); Top expressed in: stromal cell of endometrium; right hemisphere of cerebellum; cartilage tissue; mucosa of transverse colon; thoracic aorta; ascending aorta; Descending thoracic aorta; right auricle of heart; cardia; right coronary artery / Top expressed in: stroma of bone marrow; molar; supraoptic nucleus; dentate gyrus of hippocampal formation granule cell; spermatocyte; mesenteric lymph nodes; calvaria; right lung lobe; duodenum; superior frontal gyrus; More reference expression data
BioGPS	More reference expression data
Gene ontology
Molecular function	protein binding; metal ion binding; identical protein binding; calcium ion binding
Cellular component	cell projection; extracellular exosome; bleb; late endosome; Golgi lumen; cytoplasm; membrane; plasma membrane; Golgi apparatus; endoplasmic reticulum
Biological process	UV protection; zymogen granule exocytosis; response to ethanol; cerebellum development; calcium-ion regulated exocytosis; exocytosis; fat cell differentiation
Sources:Amigo / QuickGO
Orthologs
Databases	NCBI: entry; OMA: entry
Species	Human	Mouse
Entrez	51150	20318
Ensembl	ENSG00000078808	ENSMUSG00000029076
UniProt	Q9BRK5	Q61112
RefSeq (mRNA)	NM_016176; NM_016547	NM_011341; NM_001302467; NM_001302468; NM_001302469
RefSeq (protein)	NP_057260; NP_057631	NP_001289396; NP_001289397; NP_001289398; NP_035471
Location (UCSC)	Chr 1: 1.22 – 1.23 Mb	Chr 4: 156.08 – 156.1 Mb
PubMed search
- Wikidata
View/Edit Human	View/Edit Mouse

45 kDa calcium-binding protein is a protein that in humans is encoded by the SDF4 gene.
