= SLC25A24 =

Protein found in humans

Identifiers
- Aliases: SLC25A24, APC1, SCAMC-1, solute carrier family 25 member 24, SCAMC1
- External IDs: OMIM: 608744; MGI: 1917160; GeneCards: SLC25A24
Available structures
PDB	Ortholog search: PDBe RCSB
PDB	List of PDB id codes 4N5X, 4ZCU, 4ZCV

Gene location (Human)
Chr.	Chromosome 1 (human)
Band	1p13.3	Start	108,134,043 bp
Band	1p13.3	End	108,200,849 bp

Gene location (Mouse)
Chr.	Chromosome 3 (mouse)
Band	3|3 F3	Start	109,030,465 bp
Band	3|3 F3	End	109,075,773 bp
RNA expression pattern
Bgee	Human / Mouse (ortholog); Top expressed in: rectum; duodenum; islet of Langerhans; monocyte; Achilles tendon; endometrium; mucosa of transverse colon; smooth muscle tissue; placenta; gallbladder / Top expressed in: left colon; transitional epithelium of urinary bladder; endothelial cell of lymphatic vessel; stroma of bone marrow; cumulus cell; conjunctival fornix; umbilical cord; ileum; human fetus; endocardial cushion; More reference expression data
BioGPS	n/a
Gene ontology
Molecular function	calcium ion binding; ATP transmembrane transporter activity; metal ion binding; ADP transmembrane transporter activity; transmembrane transporter activity
Cellular component	integral component of membrane; membrane; mitochondrion; mitochondrial inner membrane
Biological process	regulation of cell death; cellular response to calcium ion; cellular response to oxidative stress; mitochondrial transport; transmembrane transport; ATP transport; ADP transport
Sources:Amigo / QuickGO
Orthologs
Databases	NCBI: entry; OMA: entry
Species	Human	Mouse
Entrez	29957	229731
Ensembl	ENSG00000085491; ENSG00000284468	ENSMUSG00000040322
UniProt	Q6NUK1	Q8BMD8
RefSeq (mRNA)	NM_013386; NM_213651	NM_172685
RefSeq (protein)	NP_037518; NP_998816	NP_766273
Location (UCSC)	Chr 1: 108.13 – 108.2 Mb	Chr 3: 109.03 – 109.08 Mb
PubMed search
- Wikidata
View/Edit Human	View/Edit Mouse

Calcium-binding mitochondrial carrier protein SCaMC-1 is a protein that in humans is encoded by the SLC25A24 gene.

== Function ==
This gene encodes a carrier protein that transports ATP-Mg exchanging it for phosphate. Multiple transcript variants encoding different isoforms have been found for this gene.
