= KCNIP1 =

Protein-coding gene in the species Homo sapiens

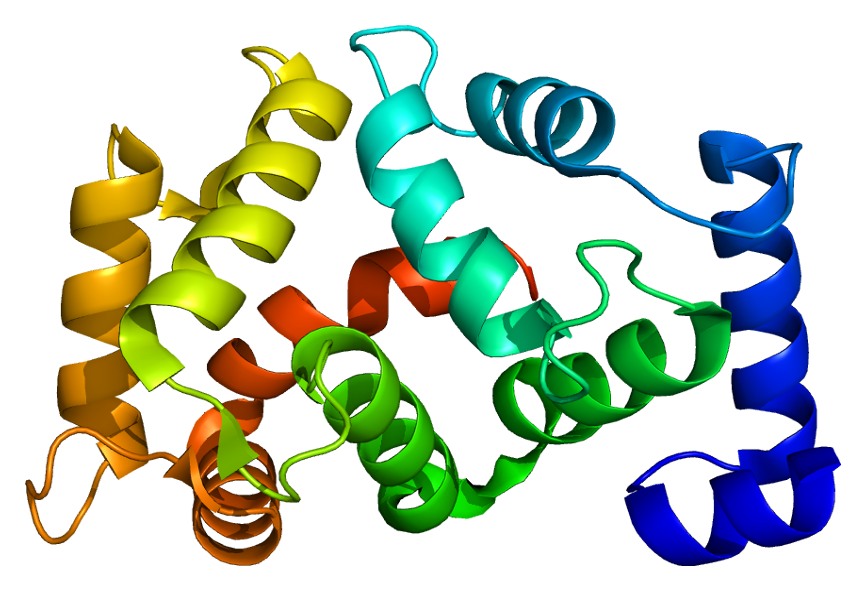

Identifiers
- Aliases: KCNIP1, KCHIP1, VABP, potassium voltage-gated channel interacting protein 1
- External IDs: OMIM: 604660; MGI: 1917607; GeneCards: KCNIP1
Available structures
PDB	Ortholog search: PDBe RCSB
PDB	List of PDB id codes 1S1E, 2I2R, 2NZ0

Gene location (Human)
Chr.	Chromosome 5 (human)
Band	5q35.1	Start	170,353,487 bp
Band	5q35.1	End	170,736,632 bp

Gene location (Mouse)
Chr.	Chromosome 11 (mouse)
Band	11|11 A4	Start	33,579,339 bp
Band	11|11 A4	End	33,943,152 bp
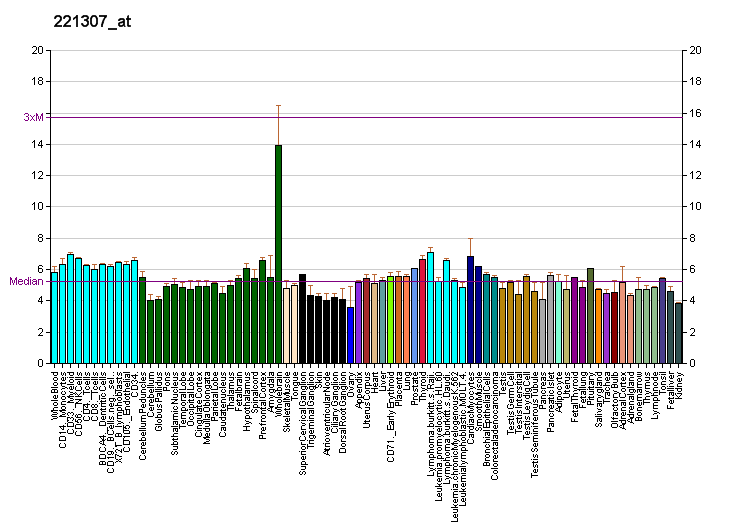
RNA expression pattern
Bgee	Human / Mouse (ortholog); Top expressed in: nucleus accumbens; anterior cingulate cortex; caudate nucleus; amygdala; right frontal lobe; prefrontal cortex; hypothalamus; putamen; testicle; dorsolateral prefrontal cortex / Top expressed in: habenula; dorsomedial hypothalamic nucleus; lateral hypothalamus; ventromedial nucleus; superior colliculus; lobe of cerebellum; cerebellar vermis; paraventricular nucleus of hypothalamus; lateral septal nucleus; islet of Langerhans; More reference expression data
BioGPS	More reference expression data
Gene ontology
Molecular function	calcium ion binding; potassium channel regulator activity; potassium channel activity; protein binding; metal ion binding; voltage-gated ion channel activity
Cellular component	cytoplasm; extrinsic component of cytoplasmic side of plasma membrane; voltage-gated potassium channel complex; plasma membrane; cell projection; dendrite; membrane
Biological process	potassium ion transport; regulation of ion transmembrane transport; ion transport; regulation of potassium ion transmembrane transport; potassium ion transmembrane transport; cardiac conduction
Sources:Amigo / QuickGO
Orthologs
Databases	NCBI: entry; OMA: entry
Species	Human	Mouse
Entrez	30820	70357
Ensembl	ENSG00000182132	ENSMUSG00000053519
UniProt	Q9NZI2	Q9JJ57
RefSeq (mRNA)	NM_001034837; NM_001034838; NM_001278339; NM_001278340; NM_014592	NM_001190885; NM_001190886; NM_001290690; NM_027398; NM_001363115
RefSeq (protein)	NP_001030009; NP_001030010; NP_001265268; NP_001265269; NP_055407	NP_001177814; NP_001177815; NP_001277619; NP_081674; NP_001350044
Location (UCSC)	Chr 5: 170.35 – 170.74 Mb	Chr 11: 33.58 – 33.94 Mb
PubMed search
- Wikidata
View/Edit Human	View/Edit Mouse

K_{v} channel-interacting protein 1 also known as KChIP1 is a protein that in humans is encoded by the KCNIP1 gene.

== Function ==
This gene encodes a member of the family of voltage-gated potassium (K_{v}) channel-interacting proteins (KCNIPs, also frequently called "KChIP"), which belong to the recoverin branch of the EF-hand superfamily. Members of the KCNIP family are small calcium binding proteins. They all have EF-hand-like domains, and differ from each other in the N-terminus. They are integral subunit components of native K_{v}4 channel complexes. They may regulate A-type currents, and hence neuronal excitability, in response to changes in intracellular calcium. Alternative splicing results in multiple transcript variant encoding different isoforms.

== See also ==
- Voltage-gated potassium channel
