= Reticulocalbin 2 =

Protein-coding gene in the species Homo sapiens

RCN2

Identifiers
- Aliases: RCN2, E6BP, ERC-55, ERC55, TCBP49, reticulocalbin 2
- External IDs: OMIM: 602584; MGI: 1349765; GeneCards: RCN2

Gene location (Human)
| Chr. | Chromosome 15 (human) |
| Band | 15q24.3 | Start | 76,931,738 bp |
| Band | 15q24.3 | End | 76,954,393 bp |

Gene location (Mouse)
| Chr. | Chromosome 9 (mouse) |
| Band | 9|9 B | Start | 55,949,129 bp |
| Band | 9|9 B | End | 55,969,166 bp |
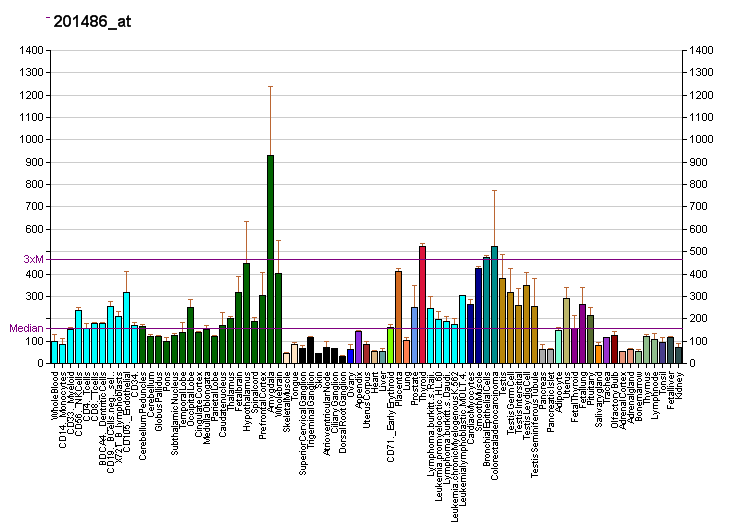

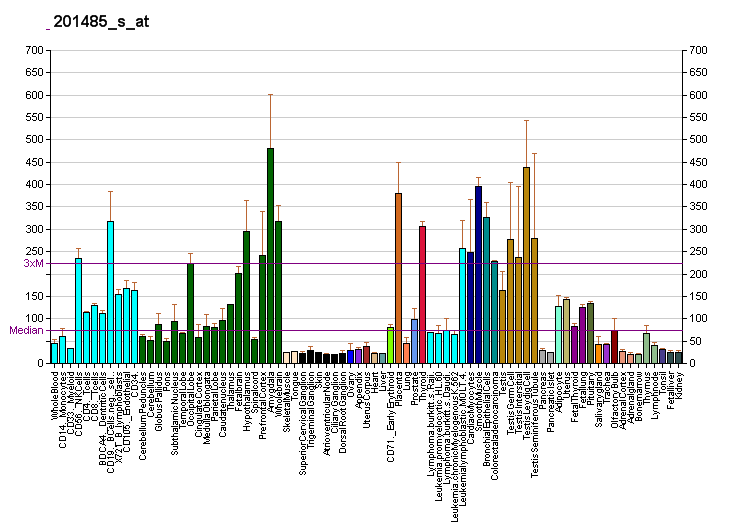
RNA expression pattern
| Bgee | Human / Mouse (ortholog); Top expressed in: corpus epididymis; tibia; caput epididymis; embryo; ventricular zone; ganglionic eminence; cartilage tissue; retinal pigment epithelium; endometrium; tail of epididymis / Top expressed in: saccule; otic placode; dorsomedial hypothalamic nucleus; spermatocyte; paraventricular nucleus of hypothalamus; mammillary body; arcuate nucleus; lateral hypothalamus; median eminence; otic vesicle; More reference expression data |
| BioGPS | More reference expression data |
Orthologs
| Databases | NCBI: entry; OMA: entry |
| Species | Human | Mouse |
| Entrez | 5955 | 26611 |
| Ensembl | ENSG00000117906 | ENSMUSG00000032320 |
| UniProt | Q14257 | Q8BP92 |
| RefSeq (mRNA) | NM_002902; NM_001271837 | NM_001278274; NM_011992 |
| RefSeq (protein) | NP_001258766; NP_002893 | NP_001265203; NP_036122 |
| Location (UCSC) | Chr 15: 76.93 – 76.95 Mb | Chr 9: 55.95 – 55.97 Mb |
| PubMed search |
- Wikidata
| View/Edit Human | View/Edit Mouse |

Reticulocalbin-2 is a protein that in humans is encoded by the RCN2 gene.

Reticulocalbin 2 is a calcium-binding protein located in the lumen of the ER. The protein contains six conserved regions with similarity to a high affinity Ca(+2)-binding motif, the EF-hand. The RCN2 gene maps to the same region as type 4 Bardet-Biedl syndrome (MIM:600374), suggesting a possible causative role for reticulocalbin 2 in the disorder.
