= KCNIP2 =

Protein-coding gene in the species Homo sapiens

Identifiers
- Aliases: KCNIP2, KCHIP2, potassium voltage-gated channel interacting protein 2
- External IDs: OMIM: 604661; MGI: 2135916; GeneCards: KCNIP2

Gene location (Human)
Chr.	Chromosome 10 (human)
Band	10q24.32	Start	101,825,974 bp
Band	10q24.32	End	101,843,920 bp

Gene location (Mouse)
Chr.	Chromosome 19 (mouse)
Band	19 C3|19 38.75 cM	Start	45,780,278 bp
Band	19 C3|19 38.75 cM	End	45,804,500 bp
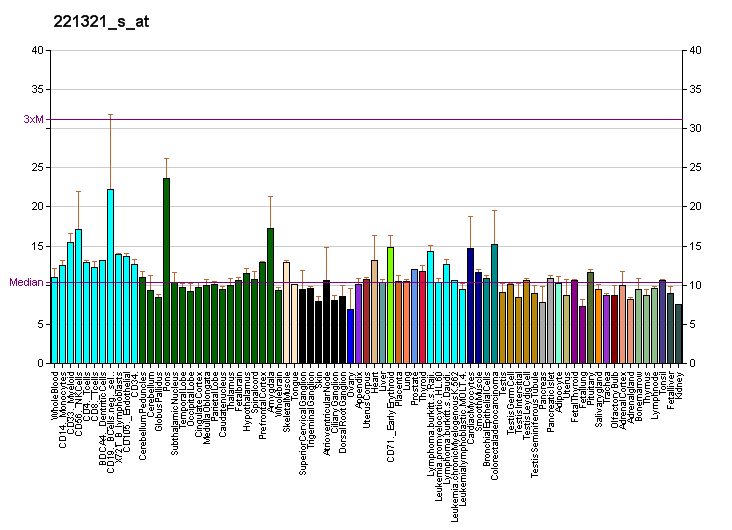
RNA expression pattern
Bgee	Human / Mouse (ortholog); Top expressed in: apex of heart; right auricle of heart; nucleus accumbens; caudate nucleus; putamen; right frontal lobe; left ventricle; anterior cingulate cortex; cardiac muscle tissue of right atrium; right hemisphere of cerebellum / Top expressed in: interventricular septum; olfactory tubercle; dentate gyrus; lateral septal nucleus; superior frontal gyrus; dentate gyrus of hippocampal formation granule cell; nucleus accumbens; primary visual cortex; anterior amygdaloid area; myocardium of ventricle; More reference expression data
BioGPS	More reference expression data
Gene ontology
Molecular function	calcium ion binding; potassium channel activity; ER retention sequence binding; transmembrane transporter binding; protein N-terminus binding; metal ion binding; voltage-gated ion channel activity; protein binding; A-type (transient outward) potassium channel activity; identical protein binding; voltage-gated potassium channel activity involved in cardiac muscle cell action potential repolarization; potassium channel regulator activity
Cellular component	cytoplasm; membrane; plasma membrane; potassium channel complex; voltage-gated potassium channel complex
Biological process	clustering of voltage-gated potassium channels; muscle contraction; regulation of heart contraction; regulation of ion transmembrane transport; ion transport; detection of calcium ion; potassium ion transport; membrane repolarization; regulation of cation channel activity; potassium ion transmembrane transport; regulation of potassium ion transmembrane transport; signal transduction; chemical synaptic transmission; membrane repolarization during cardiac muscle cell action potential; potassium ion export across plasma membrane; positive regulation of potassium ion export across plasma membrane; positive regulation of voltage-gated potassium channel activity; cardiac conduction
Sources:Amigo / QuickGO
Orthologs
Databases	NCBI: entry; OMA: entry
Species	Human	Mouse
Entrez	30819	80906
Ensembl	ENSG00000120049	ENSMUSG00000025221
UniProt	Q9NS61	Q9JJ69
RefSeq (mRNA)	NM_014591; NM_173191; NM_173192; NM_173193; NM_173194 NM_173195; NM_173197; NM_173342	NM_001276358; NM_030716; NM_145703; NM_145704
RefSeq (protein)	NP_055406; NP_775283; NP_775284; NP_775285; NP_775286 NP_775287; NP_775289	NP_001263287; NP_109641; NP_663749; NP_663750
Location (UCSC)	Chr 10: 101.83 – 101.84 Mb	Chr 19: 45.78 – 45.8 Mb
PubMed search
- Wikidata
View/Edit Human	View/Edit Mouse

K_{v} channel-interacting protein 2 also known as KChIP2 is a protein that in humans is encoded by the KCNIP2 gene.

== Function ==
This gene encodes a member of the family of voltage-gated potassium (K_{v}) channel-interacting proteins (KCNIPs, also frequently called "KChIP"), which belong to the recoverin branch of the EF-hand superfamily. Members of the KCNIP family are small calcium binding proteins. They all have EF-hand-like domains, and differ from each other in the N-terminus. They are integral subunit components of native K_{v}4 channel complexes. They may regulate A-type currents, and hence neuronal excitability, in response to changes in intracellular calcium. Alternative splicing results in multiple transcript variant encoding different isoforms.

== See also ==
- Voltage-gated potassium channel
