= Hippocalcin-like protein 1 =

Protein-coding gene in the species Homo sapiens

HPCAL1
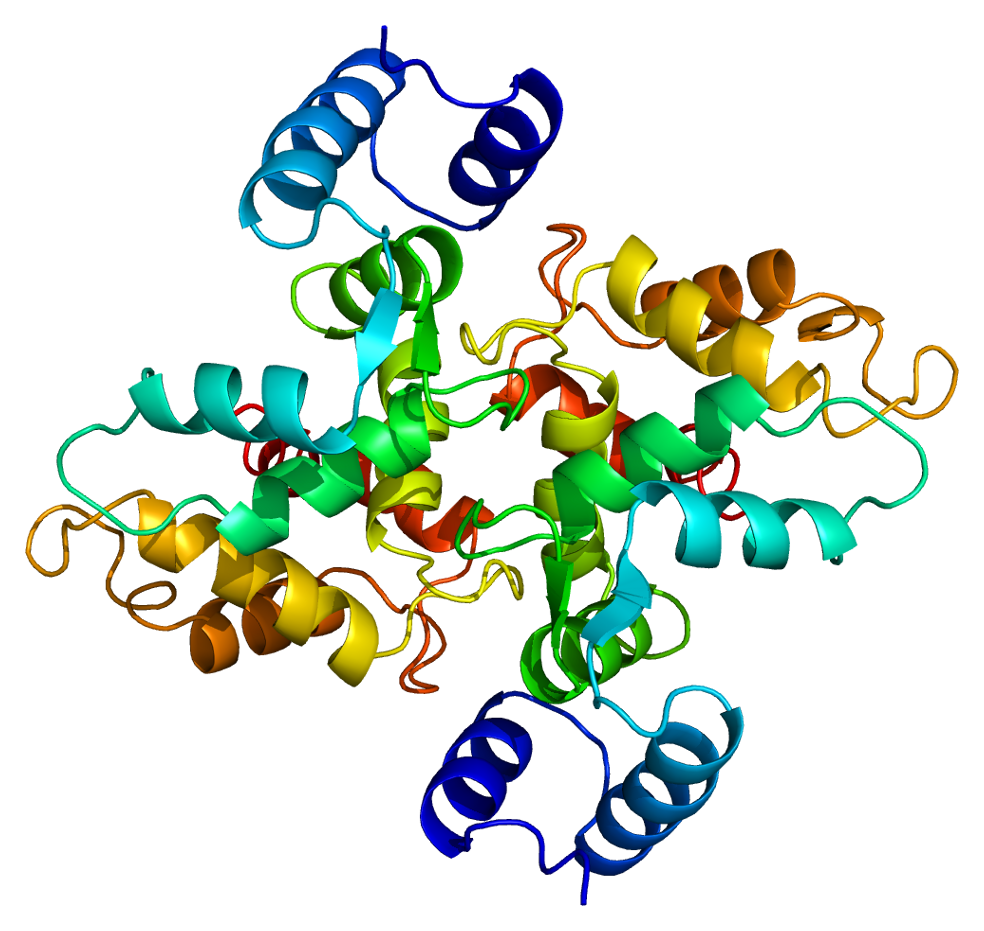

Identifiers
- Aliases: HPCAL1, BDR1, HLP2, VILIP-3, hippocalcin like 1
- External IDs: OMIM: 600207; MGI: 1855689; GeneCards: HPCAL1

Gene location (Human)
Chr.	Chromosome 2 (human)
Band	2p25.1	Start	10,302,889 bp
Band	2p25.1	End	10,427,617 bp

Gene location (Mouse)
Chr.	Chromosome 12 (mouse)
Band	12|12 A1.2	Start	17,690,856 bp
Band	12|12 A1.2	End	17,791,933 bp
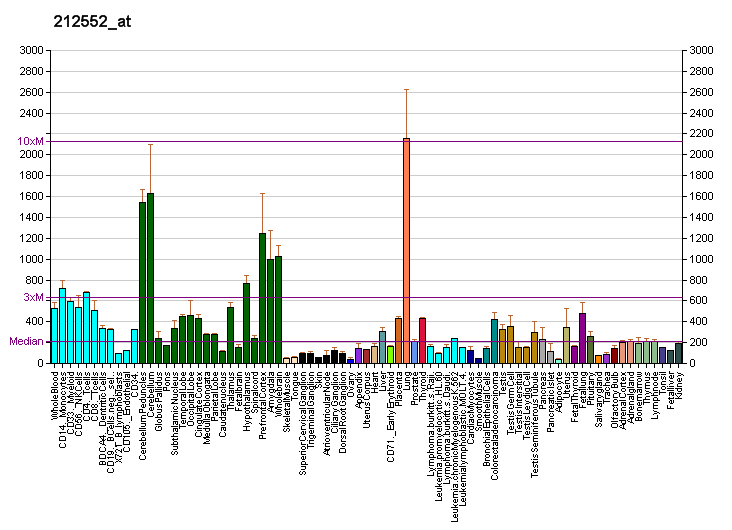

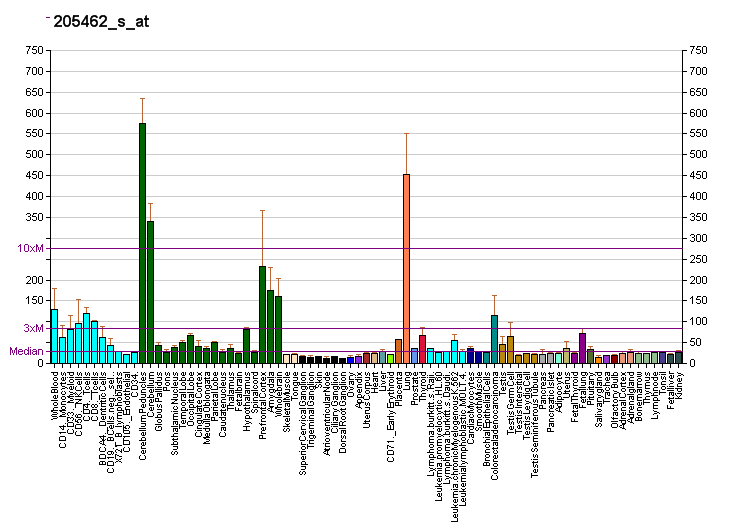
RNA expression pattern
Bgee	Human / Mouse (ortholog); Top expressed in: cerebellar vermis; paraflocculus of cerebellum; right hemisphere of cerebellum; frontal pole; Brodmann area 10; lateral nuclear group of thalamus; cingulate gyrus; anterior cingulate cortex; right frontal lobe; right lung / Top expressed in: lobe of cerebellum; cerebellar vermis; entorhinal cortex; anterior amygdaloid area; dorsomedial hypothalamic nucleus; perirhinal cortex; paraventricular nucleus of hypothalamus; ventral tegmental area; granulocyte; habenula; More reference expression data
BioGPS	More reference expression data
Orthologs
Databases	NCBI: entry; OMA: entry
Species	Human	Mouse
Entrez	3241	53602
Ensembl	ENSG00000115756	ENSMUSG00000071379
UniProt	P37235	P62748
RefSeq (mRNA)	NM_001258357; NM_001258358; NM_001258359; NM_002149; NM_134421	NM_016677; NM_001361645
RefSeq (protein)	NP_001245286; NP_001245287; NP_001245288; NP_002140; NP_602293	NP_057886; NP_001348574
Location (UCSC)	Chr 2: 10.3 – 10.43 Mb	Chr 12: 17.69 – 17.79 Mb
PubMed search
- Wikidata
View/Edit Human	View/Edit Mouse

Hippocalcin-like protein 1 is a protein that in humans is encoded by the HPCAL1 gene.

The protein encoded by this gene is a member of the neuron-specific calcium-binding proteins family found in the retina and brain. It is highly similar to human hippocalcin protein, and nearly identical to rat and mouse hippocalcin like-1 proteins. It may be involved in the calcium-dependent regulation of rhodopsin phosphorylation, and may be of relevance to neuronal signaling in the central nervous system. There are two alternatively spliced transcript variants of this gene, with multiple polyadenylation sites.
