= Visinin-like protein 1 =

Protein-coding gene in the species Homo sapiens

VSNL1

Identifiers
- Aliases: VSNL1, HLP3, HPCAL3, HUVISL1, VILIP, VILIP-1, visinin like 1
- External IDs: OMIM: 600817; MGI: 1349453; GeneCards: VSNL1

Gene location (Human)
Chr.	Chromosome 2 (human)
Band	2p24.2	Start	17,539,126 bp
Band	2p24.2	End	17,657,018 bp

Gene location (Mouse)
Chr.	Chromosome 12 (mouse)
Band	12|12 A1.1	Start	11,375,243 bp
Band	12|12 A1.1	End	11,486,614 bp
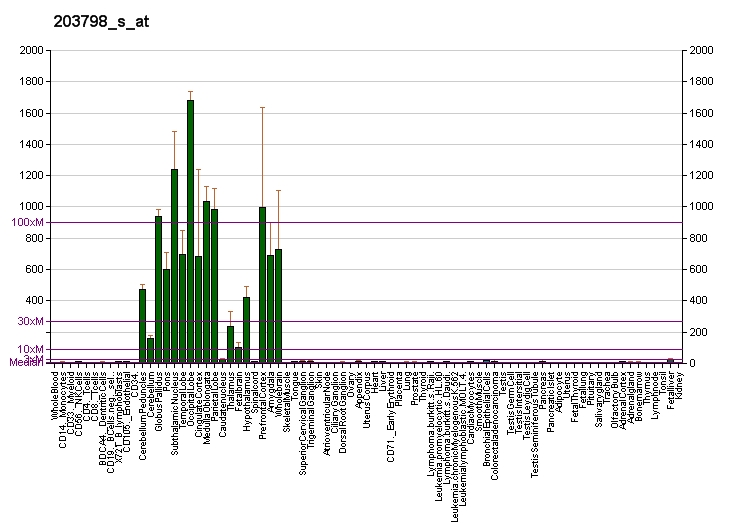

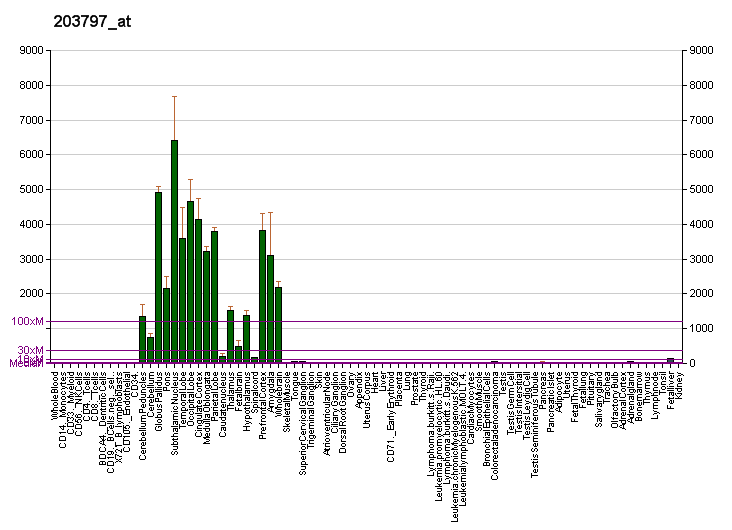
RNA expression pattern
Bgee	Human / Mouse (ortholog); Top expressed in: middle temporal gyrus; Brodmann area 23; orbitofrontal cortex; pons; superior frontal gyrus; endothelial cell; Brodmann area 10; Brodmann area 46; occipital lobe; primary visual cortex / Top expressed in: lateral septal nucleus; primary motor cortex; superior colliculus; pontine nuclei; ventral tegmental area; mammillary body; medial dorsal nucleus; central gray substance of midbrain; lobe of cerebellum; lateral hypothalamus; More reference expression data
BioGPS	More reference expression data
Gene ontology
Molecular function	calcium ion binding; protein binding; metal ion binding
Cellular component	cytosol; membrane
Biological process	positive regulation of exocytosis; positive regulation of insulin secretion involved in cellular response to glucose stimulus; negative regulation of insulin secretion
Sources:Amigo / QuickGO
Orthologs
Databases	NCBI: entry; OMA: entry
Species	Human	Mouse
Entrez	7447	26950
Ensembl	ENSG00000163032	ENSMUSG00000054459
UniProt	P62760	P62761
RefSeq (mRNA)	NM_003385	NM_012038; NM_001378929
RefSeq (protein)	NP_003376; NP_001353732; NP_001353733; NP_001353734; NP_001353735	NP_036168; NP_001365858
Location (UCSC)	Chr 2: 17.54 – 17.66 Mb	Chr 12: 11.38 – 11.49 Mb
PubMed search
- Wikidata
View/Edit Human	View/Edit Mouse

Visinin-like protein 1 is a protein that in humans is encoded by the VSNL1 gene.

This gene is a member of the visinin/recoverin subfamily of neuronal calcium sensor proteins.

The encoded protein is strongly expressed in granule cells of the cerebellum where it associates with membranes in a calcium-dependent manner and modulates intracellular signaling pathways of the central nervous system by directly or indirectly regulating the activity of adenylyl cyclase. Alternatively spliced transcript variants have been observed, but their full-length nature has not been determined.
