= KCNIP4 =

Protein-coding gene in the species Homo sapiens

Identifiers
- Aliases: KCNIP4, CALP, KCHIP4, potassium voltage-gated channel interacting protein 4
- External IDs: OMIM: 608182; MGI: 1933131; GeneCards: KCNIP4
Available structures
PDB	Ortholog search: PDBe RCSB
PDB	List of PDB id codes 3DD4

Gene location (Human)
Chr.	Chromosome 4 (human)
Band	4p15.31-p15.2	Start	20,728,606 bp
Band	4p15.31-p15.2	End	21,948,772 bp

Gene location (Mouse)
Chr.	Chromosome 5 (mouse)
Band	5|5 B3	Start	48,389,502 bp
Band	5|5 B3	End	49,524,907 bp
RNA expression pattern
Bgee	Human / Mouse (ortholog); Top expressed in: lateral nuclear group of thalamus; middle temporal gyrus; pons; cerebellar vermis; Brodmann area 23; superior frontal gyrus; parietal lobe; superior vestibular nucleus; postcentral gyrus; ventral tegmental area / Top expressed in: medial dorsal nucleus; lobe of cerebellum; medial geniculate nucleus; cerebellar vermis; medial vestibular nucleus; lateral geniculate nucleus; ventral tegmental area; supraoptic nucleus; mammillary body; superior colliculus; More reference expression data
BioGPS	n/a
Gene ontology
Molecular function	calcium ion binding; potassium channel regulator activity; potassium channel activity; voltage-gated ion channel activity; metal ion binding; protein binding
Cellular component	cytoplasm; cytosol; voltage-gated potassium channel complex; plasma membrane; endoplasmic reticulum; membrane
Biological process	potassium ion transport; regulation of ion transmembrane transport; protein localization to plasma membrane; ion transport; regulation of potassium ion transmembrane transport; potassium ion transmembrane transport; cardiac conduction
Sources:Amigo / QuickGO
Orthologs
Databases	NCBI: entry; OMA: entry
Species	Human	Mouse
Entrez	80333	80334
Ensembl	ENSG00000185774; ENSG00000281758	ENSMUSG00000029088
UniProt	Q6PIL6	Q6PHZ8
RefSeq (mRNA)	NM_001035003; NM_001035004; NM_025221; NM_147181; NM_147182 NM_147183; NM_001363504	NM_001199242; NM_001199243; NM_001199244; NM_001199245; NM_030265
RefSeq (protein)	NP_001030175; NP_001030176; NP_079497; NP_671710; NP_671711 NP_671712; NP_001350433	NP_001186171; NP_001186172; NP_001186173; NP_001186174; NP_084541
Location (UCSC)	Chr 4: 20.73 – 21.95 Mb	Chr 5: 48.39 – 49.52 Mb
PubMed search
- Wikidata
View/Edit Human	View/Edit Mouse

Kv channel-interacting protein 4 is a protein that in humans is encoded by the KCNIP4 gene.

This gene encodes a member of the family of voltage-gated potassium (Kv) channel-interacting proteins (KCNIPs), which belong to the recoverin branch of the EF-hand superfamily. Members of the KCNIP family are small calcium binding proteins. They all have EF-hand-like domains, and differ from each other in the N-terminus. They are integral subunit components of native Kv4 channel complexes. They may regulate A-type currents, and hence neuronal excitability, in response to changes in intracellular calcium. This protein member also interacts with presenilin. Multiple alternatively spliced transcript variants encoding distinct isoforms have been identified for this gene.

== Interactions ==
KCNIP4 has been shown to interact with PSEN2.

== See also ==
- Voltage-gated potassium channel
