= Hippocalcin =

Protein found in humans

HPCA

Identifiers
- Aliases: HPCA, BDR2, DYT2, hippocalcin
- External IDs: OMIM: 142622; MGI: 1336200; GeneCards: HPCA

Gene location (Human)
Chr.	Chromosome 1 (human)
Band	1p35.1	Start	32,885,994 bp
Band	1p35.1	End	32,898,441 bp

Gene location (Mouse)
Chr.	Chromosome 4 (mouse)
Band	4|4 D2.2	Start	129,005,363 bp
Band	4|4 D2.2	End	129,015,829 bp
RNA expression pattern
Bgee	Human / Mouse (ortholog); Top expressed in: caudate nucleus; middle frontal gyrus; putamen; nucleus accumbens; external globus pallidus; prefrontal cortex; right frontal lobe; Region I of hippocampus proper; Brodmann area 10; dorsolateral prefrontal cortex / Top expressed in: CA3 field; dentate gyrus of hippocampal formation granule cell; superior frontal gyrus; olfactory tubercle; primary visual cortex; hippocampus proper; Region I of hippocampus proper; nucleus accumbens; perirhinal cortex; globus pallidus; More reference expression data
BioGPS	n/a
Gene ontology
Molecular function	metal ion binding; actin binding; calcium ion binding; identical protein binding; kinase binding
Cellular component	perikaryon; dendrite membrane; neuronal cell body membrane; axon; dendritic spine head; dendrite cytoplasm; cytosol; extrinsic component of membrane; cytoplasm; membrane; postsynapse; glutamatergic synapse
Biological process	positive regulation of adenylate cyclase activity; response to organic cyclic compound; cellular response to monosodium glutamate; negative regulation of guanylate cyclase activity; positive regulation of phospholipase activity; activation of phospholipase D activity; brain development; retina development in camera-type eye; response to ketamine; response to L-glutamate; inner ear development; response to Aroclor 1254; calcium-mediated signaling; positive regulation of protein targeting to membrane; cellular response to electrical stimulus; cellular response to calcium ion; regulation of voltage-gated calcium channel activity; regulation of postsynaptic neurotransmitter receptor internalization
Sources:Amigo / QuickGO
Orthologs
Databases	NCBI: entry; OMA: entry
Species	Human	Mouse
Entrez	3208	15444
Ensembl	ENSG00000121905	ENSMUSG00000028785
UniProt	P84074	P84075
RefSeq (mRNA)	NM_002143	NM_001130419; NM_010471; NM_001286081; NM_001286083
RefSeq (protein)	NP_002134	NP_001123891; NP_001273010; NP_001273012; NP_034601
Location (UCSC)	Chr 1: 32.89 – 32.9 Mb	Chr 4: 129.01 – 129.02 Mb
PubMed search
- Wikidata
View/Edit Human	View/Edit Mouse

Hippocalcin is a protein that in humans is encoded by the HPCA gene.

Hippocalcin is a calcium-binding protein that belongs to the neuronal calcium sensor (NCS) family of proteins. It is expressed in mammalian brains especially in the hippocampus. It possesses a Ca^{2+}/myristoyl switch.

== Processes ==
Hippocalcin takes part in the following processes:

- Activation of PLD1 and PLD2 expression
- Inhibition of apoptosis
- MAP kinase signalling
- Involved in long term depression in hippocampal neuron
- Required for normal spatial learning

== Interactions ==
Hippocalcin interacts with following proteins:

- Neuronal apoptosis inhibitory protein (NAIP)
- Mixed lineage kinase 2 (MLK2) – MLK2 is myosin light chain kinase 2
- The b2 adaptin of the AP2 complex
- Calcium-dependent activator protein for secretion (CADPS)
