= CAMK =

Enzyme type

Ca^{2+}/calmodulin-dependent protein kinase

Identifiers
- EC no.: 2.7.11.17
- CAS no.: 97350-82-8

Databases
- BRENDA: enzyme data
- ExPASy: NiceZyme view
- KEGG: enzyme entry
- MetaCyc: metabolic pathway
- Rhea: reactions
- PDB structures: RCSB PDB PDBe PDBsum
- Gene Ontology: AmiGO / QuickGO
Search
- PMC: articles
- PubMed: articles
- NCBI: proteins

CAMK, also written as CaMK or CCaMK, is an abbreviation for the Ca^{2+}/calmodulin-dependent protein kinase class of enzymes. CAMKs are activated by increases in the concentration of intracellular calcium ions (Ca^{2+}) and calmodulin. When activated, the enzymes transfer phosphates from ATP to defined serine or threonine residues in other proteins, so they are serine/threonine-specific protein kinases. Activated CAMK is involved in the phosphorylation of transcription factors and therefore, in the regulation of expression of responding genes. CAMK also works to regulate the cell life cycle (i.e. programmed cell death), rearrangement of the cell's cytoskeletal network, and mechanisms involved in the learning and memory of an organism.

== Types ==
There are 2 common types of CAM Kinase proteins: specialized and multi-functional CAM kinases.

Substrate-specific CAM Kinases
only have one target that they can phosphorylate, such as myosin light chain kinases. This group of proteins includes CAMK III. More on CAMKIII can be found following this link.
Multi-functional CAM Kinases
have multiple targets they can phosphorylate and are found in processes including the secretion of neurotransmitters, metabolism of glycogen, and the regulation of various transcription factors. CAMK II is the main protein in this subset. More on CAMKII can be found following this link.

== Substrate phosphorylation ==
Figure 1: Diagram of how CAMK II becomes active in the presence of calcium or calmodulin.

Once calcium concentrations in the cell rise, CAM kinases become saturated and bind the maximum of four calcium molecules. This calcium saturation activates the kinase and allows it to undergo a conformational change which permits the kinase to bind to its phosphorylation target sites. CAMK removes a phosphate group from ATP, most typically using a Mg^{2+} ion, and adds it to the CAM protein, rendering it active. The CAM Kinase contains a highly concentrated glycine loop where the gamma phosphate from the donor ATP molecule is easily able to bind to the enzyme which then utilizes the metal ion to facilitate a smooth phosphate transfer to the target protein. This phosphate transfer then activates the kinase's target and completes the phosphorylation cycle.

Figure 1 shows how the presence of calcium or calmodulin allows for the activation of CAM kinases (CAMK II).

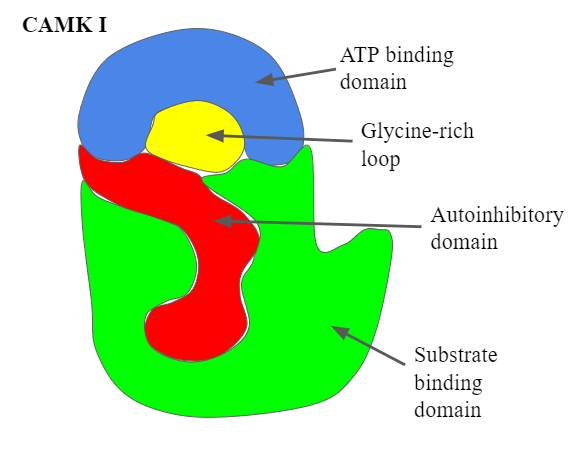
Figure 2: Graphic illustration of the crude domains of Calcium/calmodulin-dependent protein kinase 1

== Structure ==
All kinases have a common structure of a catalytic core including an ATP binding site along with a larger substrate binding site. The catalytic core is typically composed of β-strands with the substrate binding site composed of α-helices. Most all CAM kinases includes a variety of domains, including: a catalytic domain, a regulatory domain, an association domain, and a calcium/calmodulin binding domain.

CAMK I
as shown in Figure 2, has a double-lobed structure, consisting of a catalytic, substrate-binding domain and an autoinhibitory domain. For the autoinhibitory domain to become functional, it must cause the protein to conform in such a way that this domain completely blocks the substrate domain from taking in new targets. Figure 2 goes into detail showing the structure and domains of CAMK I.

CAMK II
has a variety of different forms, with CAMK 2A being the most common, as shown in Figure 3. CAMK 2A has a ring-like crystalline structure, composed of smaller functional groups. These groups allow for the CaM-dependent phosphorylation of targets, but also allows the structure to autophosphorylate itself and become CaM-independent, as seen in Figure 1. This means once the CAMK 2A protein is initially activated by calcium or calmodulin, it can, in turn, further activate itself, so it doesn't become inactive even when it is without calcium or calmodulin.

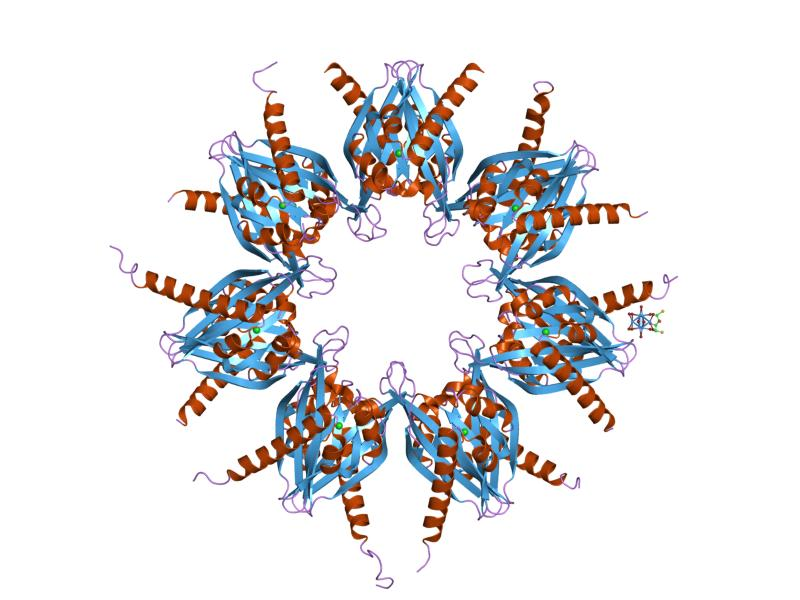
Figure 3: Image of CAMK 2A which is a form of Calcium/calmodulin-dependent kinase in its crystalline form.

== Family members ==
Members of the CAMK enzyme class include, but are not limited to:

- CAMKI
  - CAMKIα (CAMK1)
  - CAMKIβ (PNCK)
  - CAMKIδ
  - CAMKIγ (CAMK1G)
- CAMKII
  - CAMKIIα
  - CAMKIIβ
  - CAMKIIδ
  - CAMKIIγ
- CAMKIII
- CAMKIV
- CAMKV CaM kinase like vesicle associated
- SCAMK
- Ca2+/calmodulin-dependent protein kinase kinase
  - CAMKK1
  - CAMKK2

== Pseudokinases ==
Pseudokinases are pseudoenzymes, proteins that resemble enzymes structurally, but lack catalytic activity.

Some of these pseudokinases that are related to the CAMK family include:

- Tribbles subfamily
  - TRIB1
  - TRIB2
  - TRIB3
