= CAMKK2 =

Protein-coding gene in humans

Identifiers
- Aliases: CAMKK2, CAMKK, CAMKKB, calcium/calmodulin-dependent protein kinase kinase 2, calcium/calmodulin dependent protein kinase kinase 2
- External IDs: OMIM: 615002; MGI: 2444812; GeneCards: CAMKK2
Available structures
| PDB | Ortholog search: PDBe RCSB |
| PDB | List of PDB id codes 2ZV2 |
Enzyme activity
| EC # | BRENDA | ExPASy | KEGG | MetaCyc |
|---|---|---|---|---|
| 2.7.11.17 | ↗ | ↗ | ↗ | ↗ |

Gene location (Human)
| Chr. | Chromosome 12 (human) |
| Band | 12q24.31 | Start | 121,237,675 bp |
| Band | 12q24.31 | End | 121,298,308 bp |

Gene location (Mouse)
| Chr. | Chromosome 5 (mouse) |
| Band | 5|5 F | Start | 122,869,233 bp |
| Band | 5|5 F | End | 122,917,472 bp |
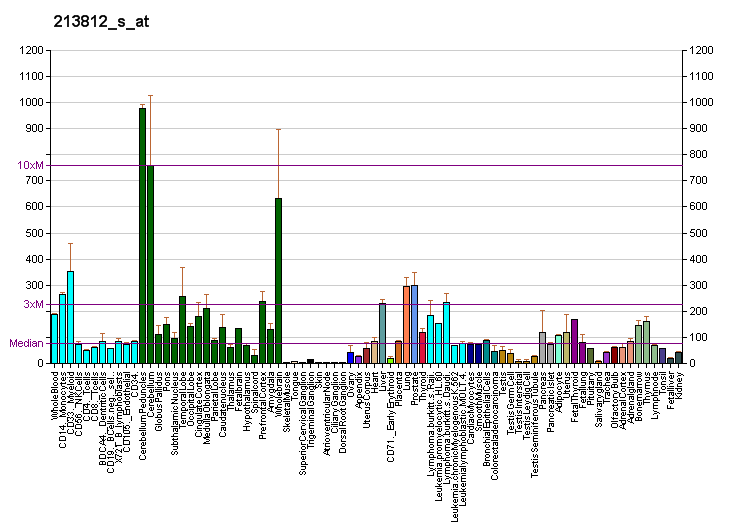

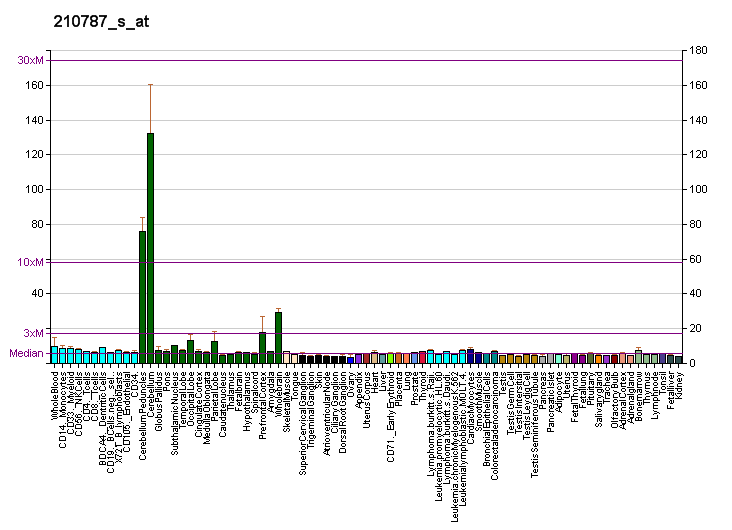

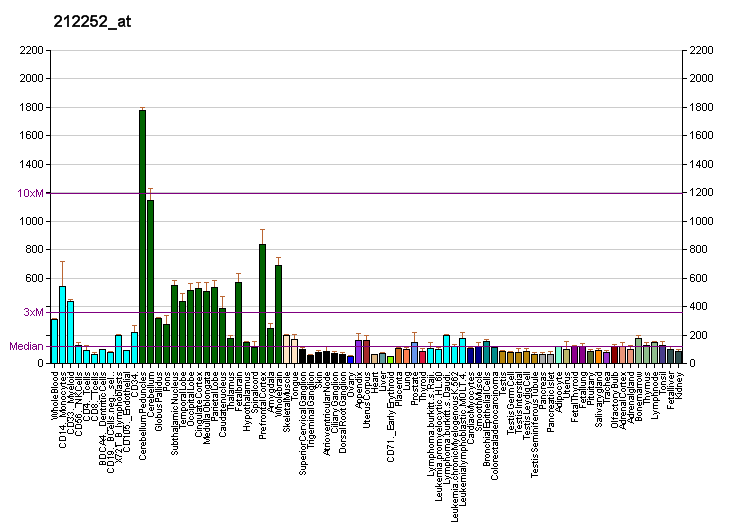
RNA expression pattern
| Bgee | Human / Mouse (ortholog); Top expressed in: cerebellar cortex; cerebellar hemisphere; right hemisphere of cerebellum; cerebellar vermis; paraflocculus of cerebellum; right frontal lobe; prefrontal cortex; dorsolateral prefrontal cortex; Brodmann area 9; orbitofrontal cortex / Top expressed in: motor neuron; medullary collecting duct; barrel cortex; superior frontal gyrus; primary motor cortex; trigeminal ganglion; dorsal striatum; visual cortex; Rostral migratory stream; primary visual cortex; More reference expression data |
| BioGPS | More reference expression data |
Gene ontology
| Molecular function | transferase activity; nucleotide binding; calcium ion binding; protein kinase activity; calmodulin binding; kinase activity; protein serine/threonine kinase activity; protein tyrosine kinase activity; ATP binding; calmodulin-dependent protein kinase activity |
| Cellular component | cell projection; intracellular anatomical structure; nucleus; cytoplasm; cytosol; nucleoplasm |
| Biological process | phosphorylation; MAPK cascade; positive regulation of transcription, DNA-templated; protein phosphorylation; protein autophosphorylation; regulation of protein kinase activity; calcium-mediated signaling; peptidyl-tyrosine phosphorylation; positive regulation of protein phosphorylation; peptidyl-serine phosphorylation; peptidyl-threonine phosphorylation; cellular response to reactive oxygen species; positive regulation of protein kinase activity; CAMKK-AMPK signaling cascade; positive regulation of autophagy of mitochondrion |
Sources:Amigo / QuickGO
Orthologs
| Databases | NCBI: entry; OMA: entry |
| Species | Human | Mouse |
| Entrez | 10645 | 207565 |
| Ensembl | ENSG00000110931 | ENSMUSG00000029471 |
| UniProt | Q96RR4 | Q8C078 |
| RefSeq (mRNA) | NM_001270485; NM_001270486; NM_006549; NM_153499; NM_153500 NM_172214; NM_172215; NM_172216; NM_172226 | NM_001199676; NM_145358 |
| RefSeq (protein) | NP_001257414; NP_001257415; NP_006540; NP_705719; NP_705720 NP_757363; NP_757364; NP_757365; NP_757380; NP_757365.1 | NP_001186605; NP_663333 |
| Location (UCSC) | Chr 12: 121.24 – 121.3 Mb | Chr 5: 122.87 – 122.92 Mb |
| PubMed search |
- Wikidata
| View/Edit Human | View/Edit Mouse |

Calcium/calmodulin-dependent protein kinase kinase 2 is an enzyme that in humans is encoded by the CAMKK2 gene.

== Function ==
The product of this gene belongs to the serine/threonine-specific protein kinase family, and to the Ca^{++}/calmodulin-dependent protein kinase subfamily. This protein plays a role in the calcium/calmodulin-dependent (CaM) kinase cascade by phosphorylating the downstream kinases CaMK1 and CaMK4, which increases their catalytic activity. CaMK1 and CaMK4 are phosphorylated at the Thr 177 and Thr 196 residues respectively.

CaMKK2 regulates production of the appetite stimulating hormone neuropeptide Y and functions as an AMPK kinase in the hypothalamus. It also has an important role in the development of hyperalgesia and tolerance to opioid analgesic drugs, through reduction in downstream signalling pathways and mu opioid receptor downregulation. Inhibition of CaMKK2 in mice reduces appetite and promotes weight loss.

CaMKK2 has several functions in different brain regions. In the hippocampus, the CaMKK2/CaMK1 cascade is necessary for memory formation through the regulation of learning-induced structural changes in the neuronal cytoskeleton. Morphological changes in dendritic spines in the hippocampus - which are necessary for initiating and maintaining the synaptic plasticity in CA1 pyramidal neurons - are the main structural basis for the formation of memories.

The CaMKK2/CaMKIV/CREB cascade is involved in the postnatal development of the cerebellum. CaMKK2 deletion impairs development of Cerebellar Granule Cells -the most abundant cells in the cerebellum- by inhibiting the ability of Granule Cell Precursors (GCPs) to stop proliferating in the external granule layer (EGL) and migrate to the internal granule layer. This phenotype is also tied to reduced BDNF expression and decreased CREB phosphorylation. Thus, the CaMKK2/CaMKIV/CREB cascade is required for BDNF (Brain Derived Neurotrophic Factor) production in the post-natal cerebellum in order to complete an important step of CGC development. Neuronal CaMKK2's regulation of BDNF was recently implicated in progression of Glioblastoma.

In the hypothalamus, CaMKK2 is involved in centrally mediating energy homeostasis by forming a signaling complex with AMPKα/β and Ca2+/CaM. Genetic ablation of CaMKK2 decreases AMPK activity in hypothalamus and down regulates NPY and AgRP gene expression in NPY Neurons, which has been shown to protect mice from diet-induced obesity, hyperglycemia, and insulin resistance. Additionally, CaMKK2 is involved in the genetic regulation of genes necessary for optimal sympathetic activity in the medial hypothalamus, and therefore bone mass accrual, which can be said to be negatively associated to sympathetic tone.

== Isoforms ==
Seven transcript variants encoding six distinct isoforms have been identified for this gene. Additional splice variants have been described but their full-length nature has not been determined. The identified isoforms exhibit a distinct ability to undergo autophosphorylation and to phosphorylate the downstream kinases.
