= BAALC =

Protein-coding gene in humans

Identifiers
- Aliases: BAALC, brain and acute leukemia, cytoplasmic, MAP3K1 and KLF4 binding, BAALC binder of MAP3K1 and KLF4
- External IDs: OMIM: 606602; MGI: 1928704; GeneCards: BAALC

Gene location (Human)
Chr.	Chromosome 8 (human)
Band	8q22.3	Start	103,140,713 bp
Band	8q22.3	End	103,230,305 bp
RNA expression pattern
Bgee	Human / Mouse (ortholog); Top expressed in: putamen; right frontal lobe; superior vestibular nucleus; anterior cingulate cortex; caudate nucleus; amygdala; hypothalamus; optic nerve; dorsolateral prefrontal cortex; substantia nigra / n/a; More reference expression data
BioGPS	n/a
Orthologs
Databases	NCBI: entry; OMA: entry
Species	Human	Mouse
Entrez	79870	118452
Ensembl	ENSG00000164929	ENSMUSG00000022296
UniProt	Q8WXS3	Q8VHV1
RefSeq (mRNA)	NM_024812; NM_001024372; NM_001364874	NM_080640
RefSeq (protein)	NP_001019543; NP_079088; NP_001351803	NP_542371
Location (UCSC)	Chr 8: 103.14 – 103.23 Mb	n/a
PubMed search
- Wikidata
View/Edit Human	View/Edit Mouse

BAALC is a gene that codes for the brain and acute leukemia cytoplasmic protein. The official symbol (BAALC) and official name (brain and acute leukemia cytoplasmic) is maintained by the HGNC. The function of BAALC is not fully understood yet, but has been suggested to have synaptic roles involving the post synaptic lipid raft. Lipid rafts are microdomains that are enriched with cholesterol and sphingolipids, lipid raft functions include membrane trafficking, signal processing, and regulation of the actin cytoskeleton. The postsynaptic lipid raft possesses many proteins and is one of the major sites for signal processing and postsynaptic density (PSD). Along with its involvement in the post synaptic lipid rafts, BAALC expression has been associated with Acute Lymphoblastic Leukemia and Acute Myeloid Leukemia.

== Genetics ==
Location of BAALC is 8q22.3

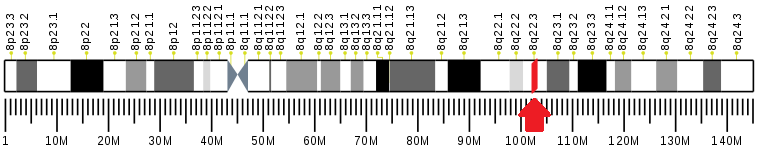
8q22.3 marked, this showing the location of BAALC gene

BAALC gene is located on the long arm (q) of chromosome 8 at position 22.3 (8q22.3). The human BAALC gene contains eight exons, spans 89 613 bases of genomic DNA, and the transcript contains 180 amino acids.

The BAALC gene is highly conserved in mammals, domestic pigs, mice and rats. But BAALC is not seen in lower organisms such as: Drosophila. melanogaster, Saccharomyces. cerevisiae, and Caenorhabditis. elegans.

BAALC and its protein are expressed highly in neural tissues such as the Central Nervous System (CNS) and the Spinal Cord, and less expressed in neuroectodermal-derived tissues like the adrenal glands. The BAALC protein is not expressed in peripheral blood leukocytes (PBL), lymph nodes, or nonneural tissues. BAALC expression has only been found in Bone Marrow (BM) when expressed from CD34+ progenitor cells, besides this BAALC expression has not been visualized. The expression of BAALC from the CD34+ progenitor cells suggest the gene has neuroectodermal and hematopoietic cell functions. BAALC expression is higher in neuroectodermal-derived tissues such as the frontal part of the brain, more specifically in the hippocampus, and neocortex.

The BAALC gene has eight different transcripts that result into six different protein isoforms. Isoforms that carry the exon number two do not express protein and it is believed that the termination in exon two results in an unstable protein after translation. The isoforms 1-6-8 and 1-8 are neuroectodermal isoforms and these are highly conserved in the above-mentioned mammals.

== Function ==
The BAALC gene initially was discovered in the neuroderm of both the human and the mouse. The function of BAALC protein is not understood very well, but it is predicted to be associated with the cytoskeleton network. When expressed in Bone Marrow CD34+ progenitor cells, BAALC has neuroectodermal and hematopoietic cell functions. Differentiation failure caused by cell shape, motility and adhesion in association between cells are all possible outcomes due to the little known effects and unclear mechanism sites of the BAALC genes. The role of the BAALC gene causing leukemia in immature acute leukemic cells has been found by knocking out the function of BAALC gene using hairpin (stem loop) RNA in a human leukemia cell line KG1a. The result of knocking out BAALC expression is a decrease in uncontrolled cell growth and an increase in programmed cell death. The BAALC protein isoform 1-6-8, has been found to interact and associate with the CAMKII alpha subunit and not with the beta subunit. The interaction with the CAMKII alpha subunit is in the CAMKII protein's regulatory region and near the autophosphorylation site, this suggested a regulatory function of the 1-6-8 isoform on the alpha subunit. BAALC 1-6-8 isoform also gets targeted to post synaptic lipid rafts, which are thought to have functions involved in: signal processing, membrane trafficking, and regulation of the actin cytoskeleton. BAALC may play a role in the regulation of the CAMKII protein through interactions with the alpha subunit, no interactions have been found with the beta subunit of this protein. Evidence has shown the BAALC protein to be an intracellular protein with cytoskeleton network roles, these roles include regulation of the actin cytoskeleton which is an associated role of postsynaptic lipid rafts.

== Clinical significance ==
In studies it has been found that overexpression of BAALC is seen in 28% of people with AML and 65% of people with ALL. BAALC is ruled out as a marker for neoplasia because it is not expressed in other cancer cells. BAALC is seen in acute leukemia in immature myoblasts and early progenitor cells, but is excluded from mature hematopoietic cells. It has been found in studies that acute myeloid leukemia patients who over expressed BAALC (BAALC Positive) had a median of approximately 5 months of event free survival, but those who were BAALC negative had a median of around 15 months. Research has found when BAALC is combined with the oncogene Hoxa9, BAALC blocks myeloid differentiation. This blocking induces leukemogenesis. BAALC over-expression is associated with IDH1 and IDH2 wild type in Chinese cytogenetically normal acute myeloid leukemia patients. The results found by Zhou et al. are different than that found by Weber et al. where no difference in mutations in IDH1 and IDH2 were seen depending on expression of BAALC. IGFBP7 is another gene involved in leukemia, this was found conducting gene expression profiles (GEP) with BAALC. This gene has BAALC characteristics and, unlike BAALC, may have a role in drug resistance and the mechanism of leukemogenesis. It has been found that treatment for some acute leukemias failed due to BAALC and this suggests BAALC to be a potential surrogate marker. The use of BAALC expression in acute leukemia prognosis is unclear and being studied. The prognosis of patients with AML and BAALC over-expression has been found to be poor or worse than poor. Over-expression of the BAALC gene and considerable accumulation of the gene production has been found to have caused drug resistance in patients.

== Expression in Cancers ==
Cancer	Under or Over expression	Evaluation Method	Reference
Acute Myeloid Leukemia (AML)	Over Expression	RT-PCR	
Acute Lymphoblastic Leukemia (ALL)	Over Expression	RT-PCR	

Overexpression of the BAALC gene is seen in Acute Myeloid Leukemia (AML) and Acute Lymphoblastic Leukemia (ALL). It has been found that BAALC can cause the start of Leukemia (leukemogenesis) by stopping the differentiation of myeloid. Silencing BAALC lowers the amount of proliferation and increased cell death (apoptosis) in leukemic cell lines KG1a It has also been found with the over-expression of the BAALC genes to cause low levels of complete remission in cancer patients, and low amount of overall survival in patients.

== Structure ==
The human BAALC gene contains eight exons, spans 89 613 bases of genomic DNA, and the transcript contains 180 amino acids. This gene codes for eight different transcripts that are translated into six different protein isoforms. Isoforms containing exon number two (1-2-6-8 and 1-2-5-6-8) do not code protein and so exon two contains a termination codon. The isoforms 1-6-8 and 1-8 are neuroectodermal isoforms and these are highly conserved in mammals.

BAALC protein isoform 1-6-8 is modified by myristoylation and palmitoylation at the N-terminal. These modifications occur on the Glycine 2 and Cysteine 3 amino acids of the protein. These modifications are used for targeting the protein to the lipid rafts. Little phosphorylation of the BAALC isoform 1-6-8 by the CAMK2A protein has been found as well.

== Interactions ==
CAMK2A

== See also ==
CAMK2A

Acute Myeloid Leukemia

Acute lymphoblastic Leukemia

CD34

IGFBP7
