= PNCK =

Protein-coding gene found in humans

Identifiers
- Aliases: PNCK, BSTK3, CaMK1b, pregnancy up-regulated nonubiquitous CaM kinase
- External IDs: OMIM: 300680; MGI: 1347357; GeneCards: PNCK
Enzyme activity
| EC # | BRENDA | ExPASy | KEGG | MetaCyc |
|---|---|---|---|---|
| 2.7.11.17 | ↗ | ↗ | ↗ | ↗ |

Gene location (Human)
| Chr. | X chromosome (human) |
| Band | Xq28 | Start | 153,669,733 bp |
| Band | Xq28 | End | 153,689,010 bp |

Gene location (Mouse)
| Chr. | X chromosome (mouse) |
| Band | X A7.3|X 37.38 cM | Start | 72,699,600 bp |
| Band | X A7.3|X 37.38 cM | End | 72,703,723 bp |
RNA expression pattern
| Bgee | Human / Mouse (ortholog); Top expressed in: right frontal lobe; Brodmann area 9; nucleus accumbens; cingulate gyrus; anterior cingulate cortex; muscle layer of sigmoid colon; amygdala; caudate nucleus; putamen; prefrontal cortex / Top expressed in: ventromedial nucleus; dorsomedial hypothalamic nucleus; paraventricular nucleus of hypothalamus; arcuate nucleus; dentate gyrus of hippocampal formation granule cell; anterior amygdaloid area; lateral septal nucleus; lateral hypothalamus; subiculum; nucleus of stria terminalis; More reference expression data |
| BioGPS | n/a |
Gene ontology
| Molecular function | transferase activity; nucleotide binding; protein kinase activity; protein serine/threonine kinase activity; ATP binding; calmodulin binding; kinase activity; calmodulin-dependent protein kinase activity |
| Cellular component | cytoplasm; nucleus; intracellular anatomical structure |
| Biological process | protein phosphorylation; phosphorylation; peptidyl-serine phosphorylation; peptidyl-threonine phosphorylation; intracellular signal transduction |
Sources:Amigo / QuickGO
Orthologs
| Databases | NCBI: entry; OMA: entry |
| Species | Human | Mouse |
| Entrez | 139728 | 93843 |
| Ensembl | ENSG00000130822 | ENSMUSG00000002012 |
| UniProt | Q6P2M8 | Q9QYK9 |
| RefSeq (mRNA) | NM_001039582; NM_001135740; NM_198452; NM_001366975; NM_001366976 NM_001366977; NM_001366978; NM_001366979; NM_001366980 | NM_001199351; NM_001199352; NM_012040 |
| RefSeq (protein) | NP_001034671; NP_001129212; NP_001353904; NP_001353905; NP_001353906 NP_001353907; NP_001353908; NP_001353909 | NP_001186280; NP_001186281; NP_036170 |
| Location (UCSC) | Chr X: 153.67 – 153.69 Mb | Chr X: 72.7 – 72.7 Mb |
| PubMed search |
- Wikidata
| View/Edit Human | View/Edit Mouse |

Pregnancy up-regulated nonubiquitous CaM kinase (PNCK), also called Calcium/calmodulin-dependent protein kinase type 1B (CAMKIβ), is an enzyme that in humans is encoded by the gene PNCK. As a calcium/calmodulin-dependent protein kinase (CAMK), this enzyme acts as a second messenger involved in calcium-triggered signaling. The protein PNCK is predicted to phosphorylate (add phosphates to) CAMK1, CREB1, and SYN1.

== Medical significance ==
PNCK, like other members of the CAMKI family, is frequently over-expressed in specific cancers. PNCK specifically is overexpressed in certain types of breast cancer, and in clear renal cell carcinoma compared to benign tissue. Its expression has also correlated with the prognosis of acute myeloid leukaemia.
