= RRAD =

RRAD may refer to:

- Red River Army Depot, a depot-level maintenance facility located west of Texarkana, Texas
- RRAD (gene), a protein that in humans is encoded by the RRAD gene
