= Mir-219 microRNA precursor family =

mir-219 microRNA precursor family
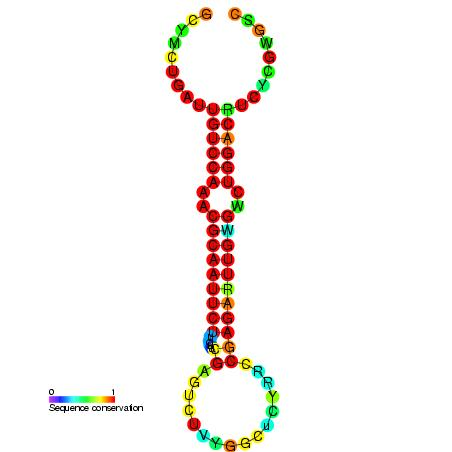
- Predicted secondary structure and sequence conservation of mir-219

Identifiers
- Symbol: mir-219
- Rfam: RF00251
- miRBase: MI0000296
- miRBase family: MIPF0000044

Other data
- RNA type: Gene; miRNA
- Domain(s): Eukaryota
- GO: GO:0035195 GO:0035068
- SO: SO:0001244
- PDB structures: PDBe

In molecular biology, the microRNA miR-219 was predicted in vertebrates by conservation between human, mouse and pufferfish and cloned in pufferfish. It was later predicted and confirmed experimentally in Drosophila. Homologs of miR-219 have since been predicted or experimentally confirmed in a wide range of species, including the platyhelminth Schmidtea mediterranea, several arthropod species and a wide range of vertebrates (MIPF0000044). The hairpin precursors (represented here) are predicted based on base pairing and cross-species conservation; their extents are not known. In this case, the mature sequence is excised from the 5' arm of the hairpin.

miR-219 has also been linked with NMDA receptor signalling in humans by targeting CaMKIIγ (a kind of protein kinase dependent to calcium and calmodulin) expression. And it has been suggested that deregulation of this miRNA can lead to the expression of mental disorders such as schizophrenia. Recent findings show that miR-219 is linked with Tau toxicity, suggesting that miR-219 is involved in neurodegenerative disease, such as Alzheimer's disease, Parkinson's disease etc.
