= Alpha-actinin-4 =

Protein-coding gene in the species Homo sapiens

ACTN4
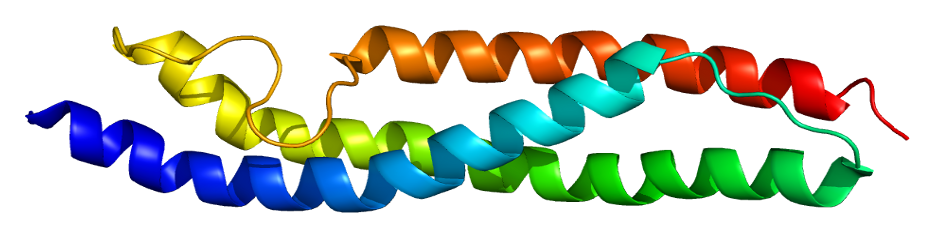

Identifiers
- Aliases: ACTN4, ACTININ-4, FSGS, FSGS1, Actinin alpha 4
- External IDs: OMIM: 604638; MGI: 1890773; GeneCards: ACTN4
Available structures
PDB	Ortholog search: PDBe RCSB
PDB	List of PDB id codes 1WLX, 1YDI, 2R0O

Gene location (Human)
Chr.	Chromosome 19 (human)
Band	19q13.2	Start	38,647,649 bp
Band	19q13.2	End	38,731,589 bp

Gene location (Mouse)
Chr.	Chromosome 7 (mouse)
Band	7|7 B1	Start	28,592,673 bp
Band	7|7 B1	End	28,661,765 bp
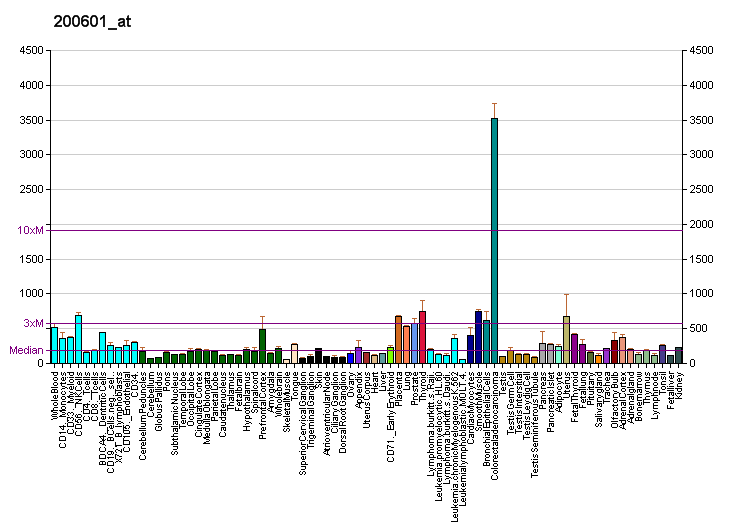
RNA expression pattern
Bgee	Human / Mouse (ortholog); Top expressed in: popliteal artery; tibial arteries; smooth muscle tissue; right coronary artery; stromal cell of endometrium; ascending aorta; placenta; body of uterus; islet of Langerhans; myometrium / Top expressed in: corneal stroma; vestibular membrane of cochlear duct; tunica media of zone of aorta; pyloric antrum; lip; neural layer of retina; internal carotid artery; conjunctival fornix; external carotid artery; genital tubercle; More reference expression data
BioGPS	More reference expression data
Gene ontology
Molecular function	metal ion binding; calcium ion binding; actin binding; protein-containing complex binding; RNA polymerase II transcription regulatory region sequence-specific DNA binding; protein homodimerization activity; protein N-terminus binding; nucleoside binding; transmembrane transporter binding; nuclear receptor coactivator activity; integrin binding; retinoic acid receptor binding; chromatin DNA binding; protein binding; actin filament binding; RNA binding; transcription coactivator activity
Cellular component	extracellular exosome; extracellular region; brush border; pseudopodium; cytoplasm; actin cytoskeleton; cell junction; nucleus; stress fiber; cell-cell junction; neuron projection; focal adhesion; platelet alpha granule lumen; intracellular anatomical structure; Z discdkac; perinuclear region of cytoplasm; cortical cytoskeleton; extracellular space; cytosol; nuclear body; cytoskeleton; protein-containing complex; ribonucleoprotein complex
Biological process	response to hypoxia; vesicle transport along actin filament; actin filament bundle assembly; positive regulation of NIK/NF-kappaB signaling; regulation of apoptotic process; positive regulation of cell migration; bicellular tight junction assembly; positive regulation of sodium:proton antiporter activity; protein localization to bicellular tight junction; platelet degranulation; positive regulation of pinocytosis; retinoic acid receptor signaling pathway; regulation of nucleic acid-templated transcription; protein transport; peroxisome proliferator activated receptor signaling pathway; negative regulation of substrate adhesion-dependent cell spreading; transport; tumor necrosis factor-mediated signaling pathway; positive regulation of nucleic acid-templated transcription
Sources:Amigo / QuickGO
Orthologs
Databases	NCBI: entry; OMA: entry
Species	Human	Mouse
Entrez	81	60595
Ensembl	ENSG00000130402; ENSG00000282844	ENSMUSG00000054808
UniProt	O43707	P57780
RefSeq (mRNA)	NM_004924; NM_001322033	NM_021895; NM_001360548; NM_001360549; NM_001360550
RefSeq (protein)	NP_001308962; NP_004915	NP_068695; NP_001347477; NP_001347478; NP_001347479
Location (UCSC)	Chr 19: 38.65 – 38.73 Mb	Chr 7: 28.59 – 28.66 Mb
PubMed search
- Wikidata
View/Edit Human	View/Edit Mouse

Alpha-actinin-4 is a protein that in humans is encoded by the ACTN4 gene.

Alpha actinins belong to the spectrin gene superfamily which represents a diverse group of cytoskeletal proteins, including the alpha and beta spectrins and dystrophins. Alpha actinin is an actin-binding protein with multiple roles in different cell types. In nonmuscle cells, the cytoskeletal isoform is found along microfilament bundles and adherens-type junctions, where it is involved in binding actin to the membrane. In contrast, skeletal, cardiac, and smooth muscle isoforms are localized to the Z-disc and analogous dense bodies, where they help anchor the myofibrillar actin filaments. This gene encodes a nonmuscle, alpha actinin isoform which is concentrated in the cytoplasm, and thought to be involved in metastatic processes. Mutations in this gene have been associated with focal and segmental glomerulosclerosis.

== Interactions ==
Alpha-actinin-4 has been shown to interact with PDLIM1, Sodium-hydrogen exchange regulatory cofactor 2, Collagen, type XVII, alpha 1, CAMK2A, CAMK2B, MAGI1 and TRIM3.

== See also ==
- Focal segmental glomerulosclerosis
