= TRIM3 =

Protein-coding gene in the species Homo sapiens

Identifiers
- Aliases: TRIM3, BERP, HAC1, RNF22, RNF97, tripartite motif containing 3
- External IDs: OMIM: 605493; MGI: 1860040; GeneCards: TRIM3
Enzyme activity
EC #	BRENDA	ExPASy	KEGG	MetaCyc
2.3.2.27	↗	↗	↗	↗

Gene location (Human)
Chr.	Chromosome 11 (human)
Band	11p15.4	Start	6,448,613 bp
Band	11p15.4	End	6,474,459 bp

Gene location (Mouse)
Chr.	Chromosome 7 (mouse)
Band	7|7 E3	Start	105,253,670 bp
Band	7|7 E3	End	105,282,778 bp
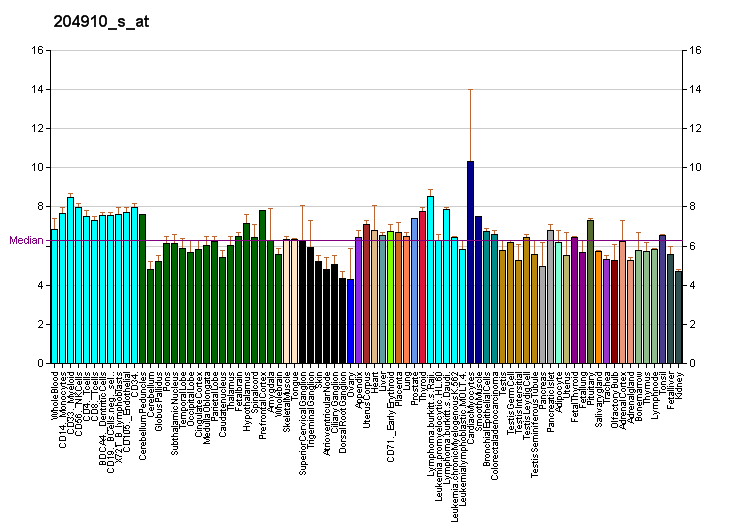

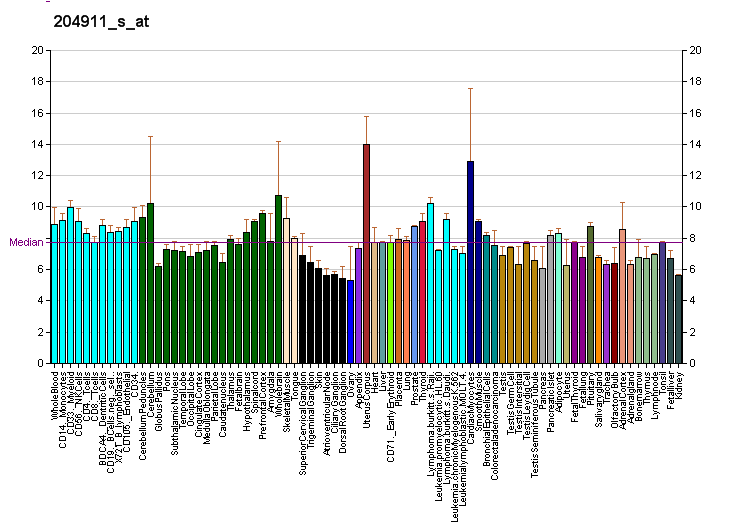

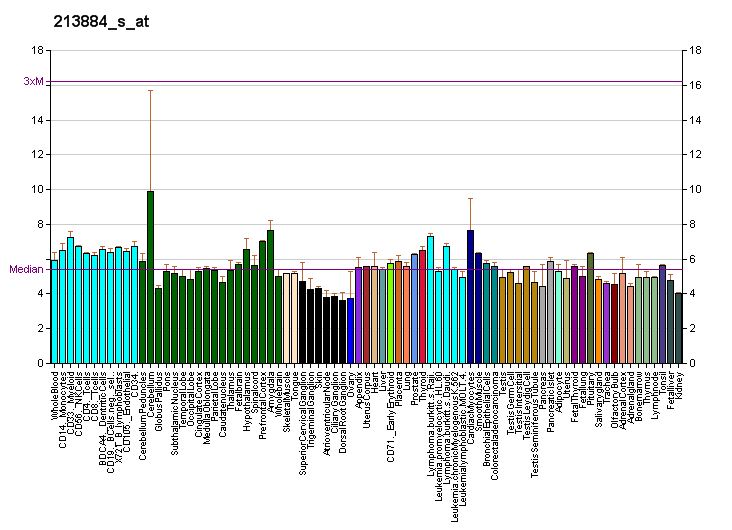
RNA expression pattern
Bgee	Human / Mouse (ortholog); Top expressed in: cerebellar hemisphere; right hemisphere of cerebellum; mucosa of transverse colon; right frontal lobe; paraflocculus of cerebellum; tibial nerve; body of uterus; right coronary artery; popliteal artery; tibial arteries / Top expressed in: cerebellar cortex; neural layer of retina; primary visual cortex; superior frontal gyrus; cerebellar vermis; lobe of cerebellum; dentate gyrus of hippocampal formation granule cell; prefrontal cortex; piriform cortex; lateral geniculate nucleus; More reference expression data
BioGPS	More reference expression data
Gene ontology
Molecular function	zinc ion binding; protein C-terminus binding; protein binding; metal ion binding; ubiquitin protein ligase activity; ubiquitin-protein transferase activity
Cellular component	cytoplasm; endosome; early endosome; intracellular anatomical structure; Golgi apparatus; dendrite; cell projection
Biological process	protein transport; protein ubiquitination; nervous system development; protein polyubiquitination; proteasome-mediated ubiquitin-dependent protein catabolic process
Sources:Amigo / QuickGO
Orthologs
Databases	NCBI: entry; OMA: entry
Species	Human	Mouse
Entrez	10612	55992
Ensembl	ENSG00000110171	ENSMUSG00000036989
UniProt	O75382	Q9R1R2
RefSeq (mRNA)	NM_001248006; NM_001248007; NM_006458; NM_033278; NM_033279	NM_001285870; NM_001285871; NM_001285873; NM_018880; NM_001360425
RefSeq (protein)	NP_001234935; NP_001234936; NP_006449; NP_150594	NP_001272799; NP_001272800; NP_001272802; NP_061368; NP_001347354
Location (UCSC)	Chr 11: 6.45 – 6.47 Mb	Chr 7: 105.25 – 105.28 Mb
PubMed search
- Wikidata
View/Edit Human	View/Edit Mouse

Tripartite motif-containing protein 3 is a protein that in humans is encoded by the TRIM3 gene.

The protein encoded by this gene is a member of the tripartite motif (TRIM) family, also called the 'RING-B-box-coiled-coil' (RBCC) subgroup of RING finger proteins. The TRIM motif includes three zinc-binding domains, a RING, a B-box type 1 and a B-box type 2, and a coiled-coil region. This protein localizes to cytoplasmic filaments. It is similar to a rat protein which is a specific partner for the tail domain of myosin V, a class of myosins which are involved in the targeted transport of organelles. The rat protein can also interact with alpha-actinin-4. Thus it is suggested that this human protein may play a role in myosin V-mediated cargo transport. Alternatively spliced transcript variants encoding the same isoform have been identified.

== Interactions ==
TRIM3 has been shown to interact with Actinin alpha 4.

TRIM3 binds to and ubiquitinates Estrogen receptor alpha (ERa) leading to receptor's stabilization.

Moreover, TRIM3 interacts with P53 which promotes the formation of K48-linked poly-ubiquitin chains and degradation.
