= CAMKK1 =

Protein-coding gene in humans

Identifiers
- Aliases: CAMKK1, CAMKKA, calcium/calmodulin-dependent protein kinase kinase 1, calcium/calmodulin dependent protein kinase kinase 1
- External IDs: OMIM: 611411; MGI: 1891766; GeneCards: CAMKK1
Enzyme activity
| EC # | BRENDA | ExPASy | KEGG | MetaCyc |
|---|---|---|---|---|
| 2.7.11.17 | ↗ | ↗ | ↗ | ↗ |

Gene location (Human)
| Chr. | Chromosome 17 (human) |
| Band | 17p13.2 | Start | 3,860,315 bp |
| Band | 17p13.2 | End | 3,894,891 bp |

Gene location (Mouse)
| Chr. | Chromosome 11 (mouse) |
| Band | 11|11 B4 | Start | 72,909,834 bp |
| Band | 11|11 B4 | End | 72,932,899 bp |
RNA expression pattern
| Bgee | Human / Mouse (ortholog); Top expressed in: right frontal lobe; pancreatic ductal cell; Brodmann area 9; prefrontal cortex; right hemisphere of cerebellum; middle temporal gyrus; primary visual cortex; endothelial cell; cingulate gyrus; anterior cingulate cortex / Top expressed in: dentate gyrus of hippocampal formation granule cell; primary visual cortex; superior frontal gyrus; hippocampus proper; facial motor nucleus; anterior horn of spinal cord; central gray substance of midbrain; lumbar subsegment of spinal cord; primary motor cortex; cerebellar cortex; More reference expression data |
| BioGPS | n/a |
Gene ontology
| Molecular function | kinase activity; transferase activity; nucleotide binding; protein kinase activity; protein serine/threonine kinase activity; protein binding; ATP binding; calmodulin-dependent protein kinase activity; calmodulin binding |
| Cellular component | cytosol; nucleus; cytoplasm; nucleoplasm |
| Biological process | protein phosphorylation; phosphorylation; peptidyl-serine phosphorylation; peptidyl-threonine phosphorylation; intracellular signal transduction; positive regulation of protein kinase activity |
Sources:Amigo / QuickGO
Orthologs
| Databases | NCBI: entry; OMA: entry |
| Species | Human | Mouse |
| Entrez | 84254 | 55984 |
| Ensembl | ENSG00000004660 | ENSMUSG00000020785 |
| UniProt | Q8N5S9 | Q8VBY2 |
| RefSeq (mRNA) | NM_032294; NM_172206; NM_172207 | NM_018883; NM_001362841 |
| RefSeq (protein) | NP_115670; NP_757343; NP_757344 | NP_061371; NP_001349770 |
| Location (UCSC) | Chr 17: 3.86 – 3.89 Mb | Chr 11: 72.91 – 72.93 Mb |
| PubMed search |
- Wikidata
| View/Edit Human | View/Edit Mouse |

Calcium/calmodulin-dependent protein kinase kinase 1 is an enzyme that in humans is encoded by the CAMKK1 gene.

The product of this gene belongs to the serine/threonine protein kinase family, and to the Ca(2+)/calmodulin-dependent protein kinase (CAMK) subfamily. This protein plays a role in the calcium/calmodulin-dependent (CaM) kinase cascade. Three transcript variants encoding two distinct isoforms have been identified for this gene.
