= Ca2+/calmodulin-dependent protein kinase II =

Class of enzymes

Calcium/calmodulin dependent protein kinase II association domain
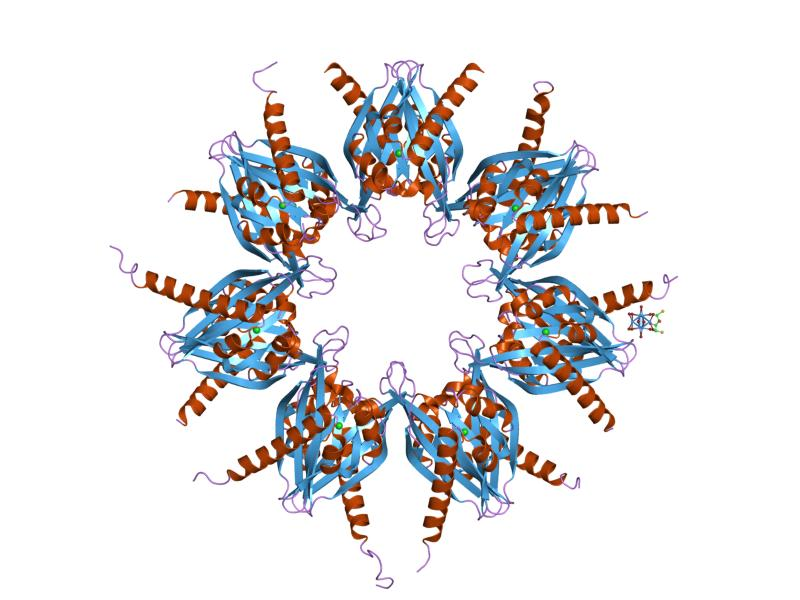
- Crystal structure of calcium/calmodulin-dependent protein kinase

Identifiers
- Symbol: CaMKII_AD
- Pfam: PF08332
- Pfam clan: CL0051
- InterPro: IPR013543
Available protein structures:
- PDB: IPR013543 PF08332 (ECOD; PDBsum)
- AlphaFold: IPR013543; PF08332

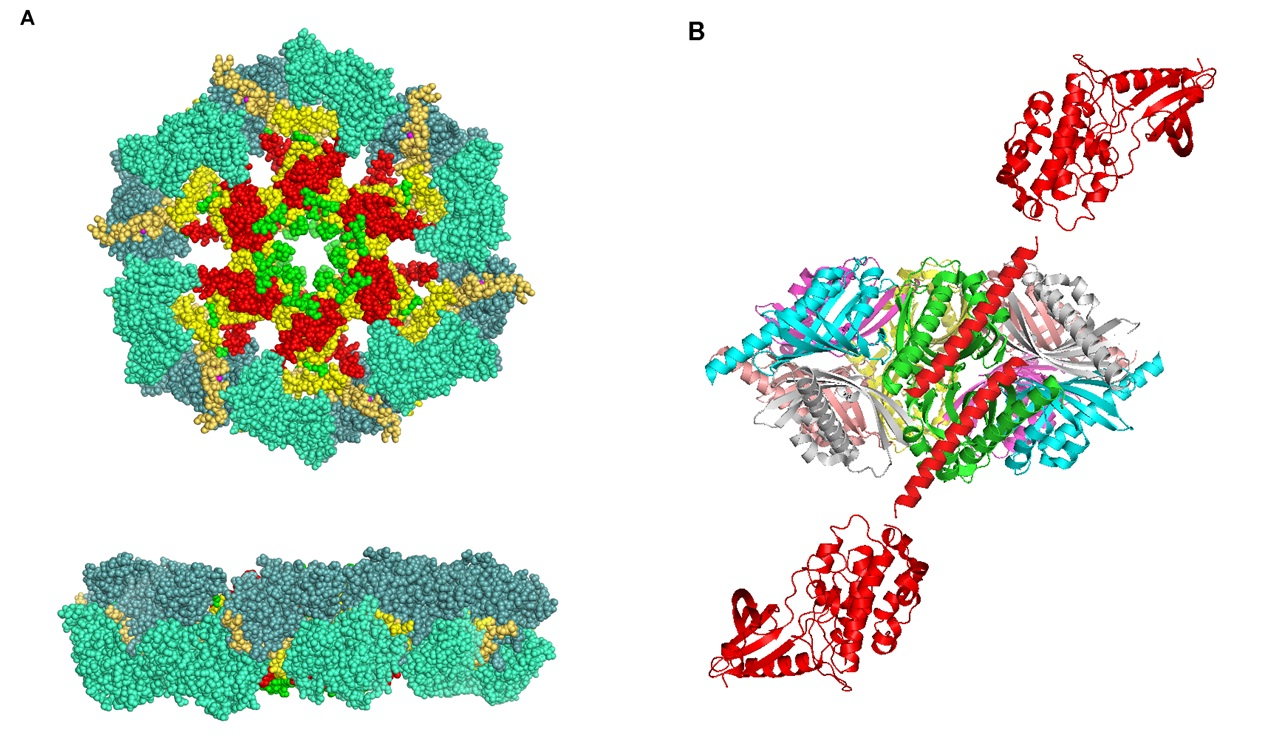
CaMKII gamma holoenzyme in its (A) closed and the (B) open conformations

Ca^{2+}/calmodulin-dependent protein kinase II (CaM kinase II or CaMKII) is a serine/threonine-specific protein kinase that is regulated by the Ca^{2+}/calmodulin complex. CaMKII is involved in many signaling cascades and is thought to be an important mediator of learning and memory. CaMKII is also necessary for Ca^{2+} homeostasis and reuptake in cardiomyocytes, chloride transport in epithelia, positive T-cell selection, and CD8 T-cell activation.

Misregulation of CaMKII is linked to Alzheimer's disease, Angelman syndrome, and heart arrhythmia.

== Types ==
There are more than 80 CaM kinases that can be classified into two types:

- Specialized CaM kinases, such as the myosin light chain kinase that phosphorylates myosin, causing smooth muscles to contract.
- Multifunctional CaM kinases, such as the four isozymes of CaM kinase II, which play a role in neurotransmitter secretion, transcription factor regulation, and glycogen metabolism.

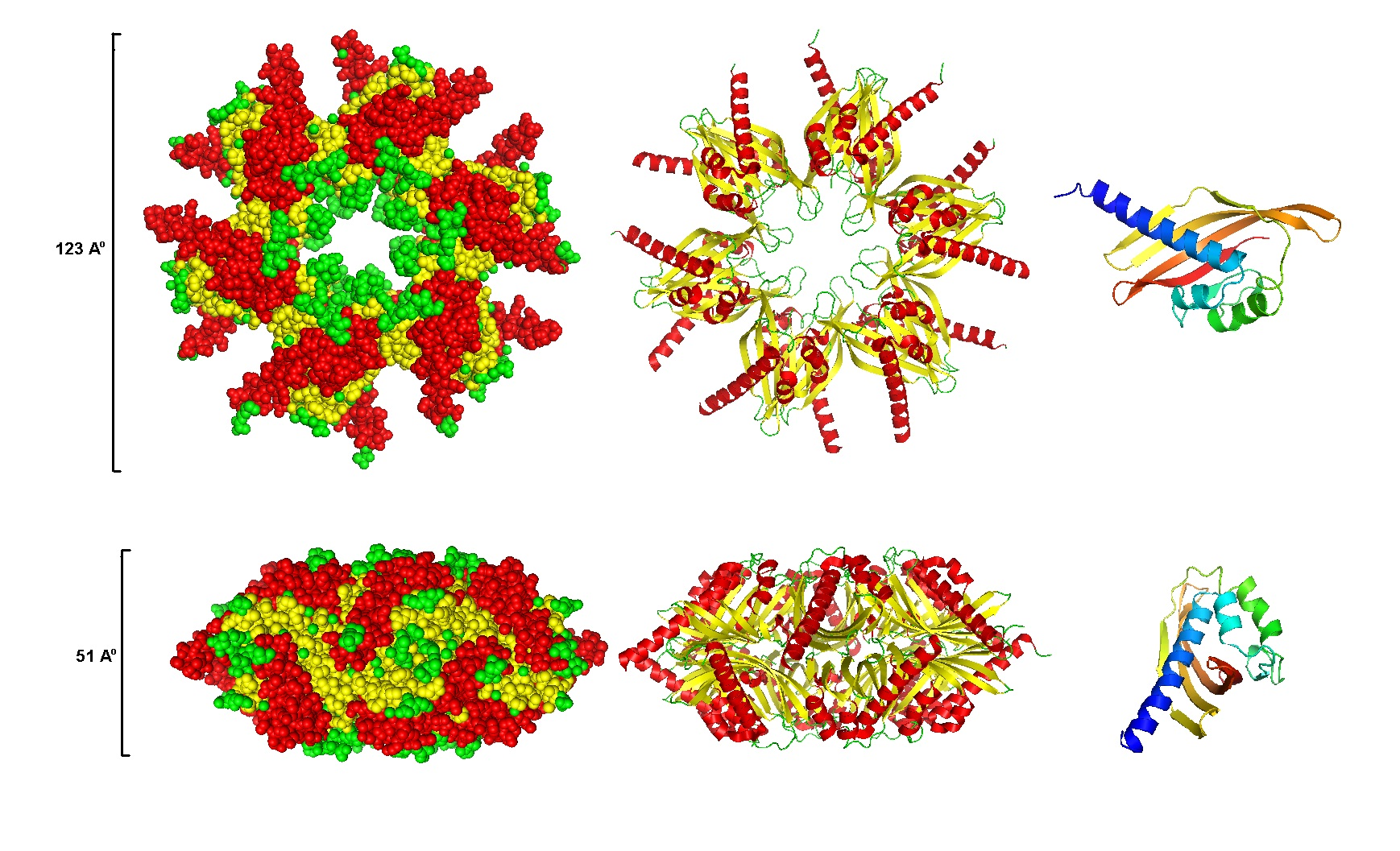
The structure of the association domain of CaMKII gamma rendered by pymol from PDB 2ux0 (left) space fill holoenzyme (center) cartoon holoemzyme (right) cartoon monome

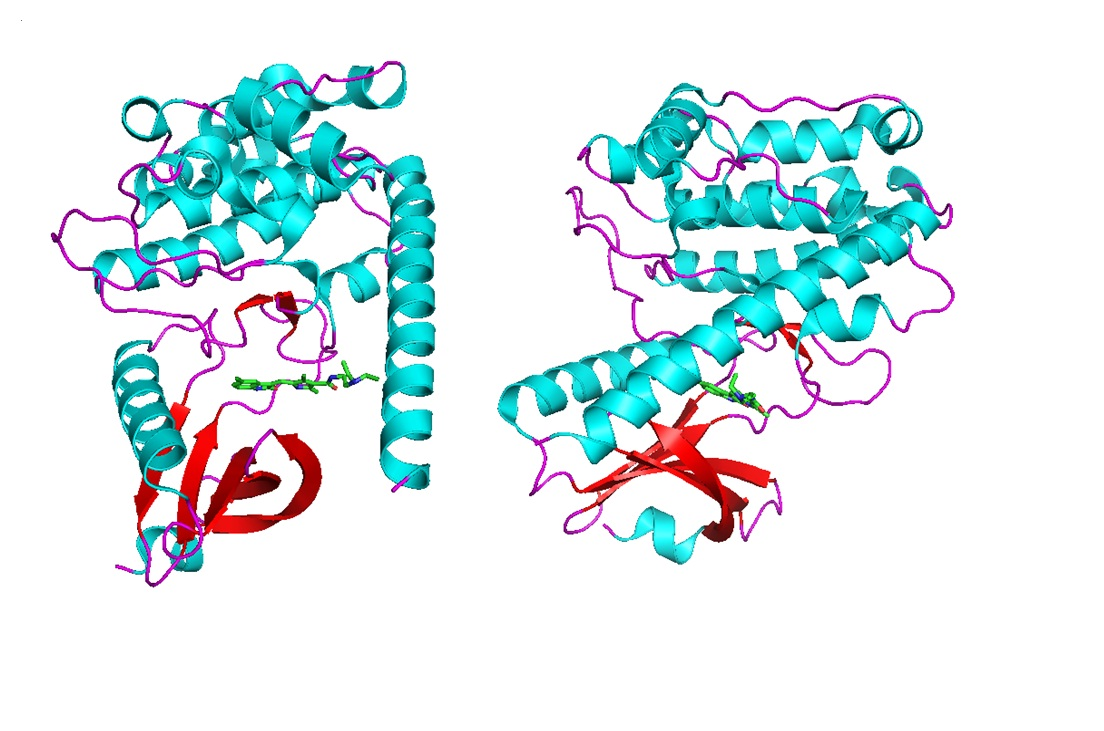
The structure of the kinase domain of CaMKII (gamma) rendered by pymol from PDB 2v7O, green sticks = nucleotide

== Structure, function, and autoregulation ==
Activation and autoregulation of CaMKII

CaMKII accounts for 1–2% of all proteins in the brain, and has 28 different isoforms. The isoforms derive from the alpha, beta, gamma, and delta genes.

=== Structural domains ===
All of the isoforms of CaMKII have: a catalytic domain, an autoinhibitory regulatory domain, a variable segment, and a self-association domain.

The catalytic domain binds ATP and substrate proteins; it is responsible for the transfer of phosphate from ATP to Ser or Thr residues in the substrate proteins. The autoinhibitory regulatory domain features a pseudosubstrate site, which binds to the catalytic domain and blocks its ability to phosphorylate proteins.

The structural feature that governs this autoinhibition is the Threonine 286 residue. Phosphorylation of this site will permanently activate the CaMKII enzyme. Once the Threonine 286 residue has been phosphorylated, the inhibitory domain is blocked from the pseudosubstrate site. This effectively blocks autoinhibition, allowing for permanent activation of the CaMKII enzyme. This enables CaMKII to be active, even in the absence of calcium and calmodulin.

The other two domains in CaMKII are the variable and self-association domains. Differences in these domains contribute to the various CaMKII isoforms.

The self-association domain (CaMKII AD) is found at the C terminus, the function of this domain is the assembly of the single proteins into large (8 to 14 subunits) multimers.

=== Calcium and calmodulin dependence ===
The sensitivity of the CaMKII enzyme to calcium and calmodulin is governed by the variable and self-associative domains. This sensitivity level of CaMKII will also modulate the different states of activation for the enzyme. Initially, the enzyme is activated; however, autophosphorylation does not occur because there is not enough calcium or calmodulin present to bind to neighboring subunits. As greater amounts of calcium and calmodulin accumulate, autophosphorylation occurs leading to persistent activation of the CaMKII enzyme for a short period of time. However, the Threonine 286 residue eventually becomes dephosphorylated, leading to inactivation of CaMKII.

== Autophosphorylation ==
Autophosphorylation is the process in which a kinase attaches a phosphate group to itself. When CaMKII autophosphorylates, it becomes persistently active. Phosphorylation of the Threonine 286 site allows for the activation of the catalytic domain. Autophosphorylation is enhanced by the structure of the holoenzyme because it is present in two stacked rings. The close proximity of these adjacent rings increases the probability of phosphorylation of neighboring CaMKII enzymes, furthering autophosphorylation. A mechanism that promotes autophosphorylation features inhibition of the PP1 (protein phosphatase I). This enables CaMKII to be constantly active by increasing the likelihood of autophosphorylation.

== Long-term potentiation ==
Calcium/ calmodulin dependent protein kinase II is also heavily implicated in long-term potentiation (LTP) – the molecular process of strengthening active synapses that is thought to underlie the processes of memory. It is involved in many aspects of this process. LTP is initiated when the NMDA receptors are in a local environment with a voltage potential high enough to displace the positively-charged Mg^{2+} ion from the channel pore. As a result of the channel being unblocked, Ca^{2+} ions are able to enter into the postsynaptic neuron through the NMDA receptor channel. This Ca^{2+} influx activates CaMKII. It has been shown that there is an increase in CaMKII activity directly in the post synaptic density of dendrites after LTP induction, suggesting that activation is a direct result of stimulation.

=== In LTP ===
When alpha-CaMKII is knocked out in mice, LTP is reduced by 50%. This can be explained by the fact that beta-CaMKII is responsible for approximately 65% of CaMKII activity. LTP can be completely blocked if CaMKII is modified so that it cannot remain active. After LTP induction, CaMKII moves to the postsynaptic density (PSD). However, if the stimulation does not induce LTP, the translocation is quickly reversible. Binding to the PSD changes CaMKII so that it is less likely to become dephosphorylated. CaMKII transforms from a substrate for Protein Phosphatase 2A (PP2A), which is responsible for dephosphorylating CaMKII, to that of Protein Phosphatase 1. Strack, S. (1997) demonstrated this phenomenon by chemically stimulating hippocampal slices. This experiment illustrates that CaMKII contributes to the enhancement of synaptic strength. Sanhueza et al. found that persistent activation of CaMKII is necessary for the maintenance of LTP. She induced LTP in hippocampal slices and experimentally applied an antagonist (CaMKIINtide) to prevent CaMKII from remaining active. The slices that were applied with CaMKIINtide showed a decrease in Normalized EPSP slope after the drug infusion, meaning that the induced LTP reversed itself. The Normalized EPSP slope remained constant in the control; CaMKII continues to be involved in the LTP maintenance process even after LTP establishment. CaMKII is activated by calcium/calmodulin, but it is maintained by autophosphorylation. CaMKII is activated by the NMDA-receptor-mediated Calcium elevation that occurs during LTP induction. Activation is accompanied by phosphorylation of both the alpha and beta-subunits and Thr286/287.

=== Independent induction of LTP ===
LTP can be induced by artificially injecting CaMKII. When CaMKII is infused in postsynaptically in the hippocampal slices and intracellular perfusion or viral expression, there is a two- to threefold increase in the response of the synapse to glutamate and other chemical signals.

=== Mechanistic role in LTP ===
There is strong evidence that after activation of CaMKII, CaMKII plays a role in the trafficking of AMPA receptors into the membrane and then the PSD of the dendrite. Movement of AMPA receptors increases postsynaptic response to presynaptic depolarization through strengthening the synapses. This produces LTP.

Mechanistically, CaMKII phosphorylates AMPA receptors at the P2 serine 831 site. This increases channel conductance of GluA1 subunits of AMPA receptors, which allows AMPA receptors to be more sensitive than normal during LTP. Increased AMPA receptor sensitivity leads to increased synaptic strength.

In addition to increasing the channel conductance of GluA1 subunits, CaMKII has also been shown to aid in the process of AMPA receptor exocytosis. Reserve AMPA receptors are embedded in endosomes within the cell. CaMKII can stimulate the endosomes to move to the outer membrane and activate the embedded AMPA receptors. Exocytosis of endosomes enlarges and increases the number of AMPA receptors in the synapse. The greater number of AMPA receptors increases the sensitivity of the synapse to presynaptic depolarization, and generates LTP.

=== Maintenance of LTP ===
Along with helping to establish LTP, CaMKII has been shown to be crucial in maintaining LTP. Its ability to autophosphorylate is thought to play an important role in this maintenance. Administration of certain CaMKII blockers has been shown not only to block LTP but also to reverse it in a time-dependent manner.

== Behavioral memory ==
As LTP is thought to underlie the processes of learning and memory, CaMKII is also crucial to memory formation. Behavioral studies involving genetically engineered mice have demonstrated the importance of CaMKII.

=== Preventing autophosphorylation ===
==== Deficit in spatial learning ====
In 1998, Giese and colleagues studied knockout mice that have been genetically engineered to prevent CaMKII autophosphorylation. They observed that mice had trouble finding the hidden platform in the Morris water maze task. The Morris water maze task is often used to represent hippocampus-dependent spatial learning. The mice's inability to find the hidden platform implies deficits in spatial learning.

However, these results were not entirely conclusive because memory formation deficit could also be associated with sensory motor impairment resulting from genetic alteration.

==== Deficit in fear memories ====
Irvine and colleagues in 2006 showed that preventing autophosphorylation of CaMKII cause mice to have impaired initial learning of fear conditioning. However, after repeated trials, the impaired mice exhibited similar fear memory formation as the control mice. CaMKII may play a role in rapid fear memory, but does not completely prevent fear memory in the long run.

In 2004, Rodrigues and colleagues found that fear conditioning increased phosphorylated CaMKII in lateral amygdala synapses and dendritic spines, indicating that fear conditioning could be responsible for regulating and activating the kinase. They also discovered a drug, KN-62, that inhibited CaMKII and prevented acquisition of fear conditioning and LTP.

==== Deficit in consolidation of memory traces ====
α-CaMKII heterozygous mice express half the normal protein level as the wild-type level. These mice showed normal memory storage in the hippocampus, but deficits in consolidation of memory in the cortex.

=== Overexpression ===
Mayford and colleagues engineered transgenic mice that express CaMKII with a point mutation of Thr-286 to aspartate, which mimics autophosphorylation and increases kinase activity. These mice failed to show LTP response to weak stimuli, and failed to perform hippocampus-dependent spatial learning that depended on visual or olfactory cues.

Researchers speculate these results could be due to lack of stable hippocampal place cells in these animals.

However, because genetic modifications might cause unintentional developmental changes, viral vector delivery allows the mice's genetic material to be modified at specific stages of development. It is possible with viral vector delivery to inject a specific gene of choice into a particular region of the brain in an already developed animal. This, in fact, has been done by Tonegawa group in early 1990s and by Poulsen and colleagues in 2007. Both groups used this method to inject CaMKII into the hippocampus. They found that overexpression of CaMKII resulted in slight enhancement of acquisition of new memories.

=== Addiction ===
Drug-induced changes in CaMKII function have been implicated in addiction.

== Different forms ==
=== CaMK2A ===
CaMKIIA is one of the major forms of CamKII. It has been found to play a critical role in sustaining activation of CamKII at the postsynaptic density. Studies have found that knockout mice without CaMKIIA demonstrate a low frequency of LTP. Additionally, these mice do not form persistent, stable place cells in the hippocampus.

=== CaMK2B ===
CaMK2B has an autophosphorylation site at Thr287. It functions as a targeting or docking module. Reverse transcription-polymerase chain reaction and sequencing analysis identified at least five alternative splicing variants of beta CaMKII (beta, beta6, betae, beta'e, and beta7) in brain and two of them (beta6 and beta7) were first detected in any species.

=== CaMK2D ===
CaMK2D appears in both neuronal and non-neuronal cell types. It is characterized particularly in many tumor cells, such as a variety of pancreatic, leukemic, breast and other tumor cells. found that CaMK2D is downregulated in human tumor cells.

=== CaMK2G ===
CaMK2G has been shown to be a crucial extracellular signal-regulated kinase in differentiated smooth muscle cells.

== Genes ==
- CaMK II — CAMK2A, CAMK2B, CAMK2D, CAMK2G

== See also ==
- Actin
