= CAMK2D =

Protein-coding gene in humans

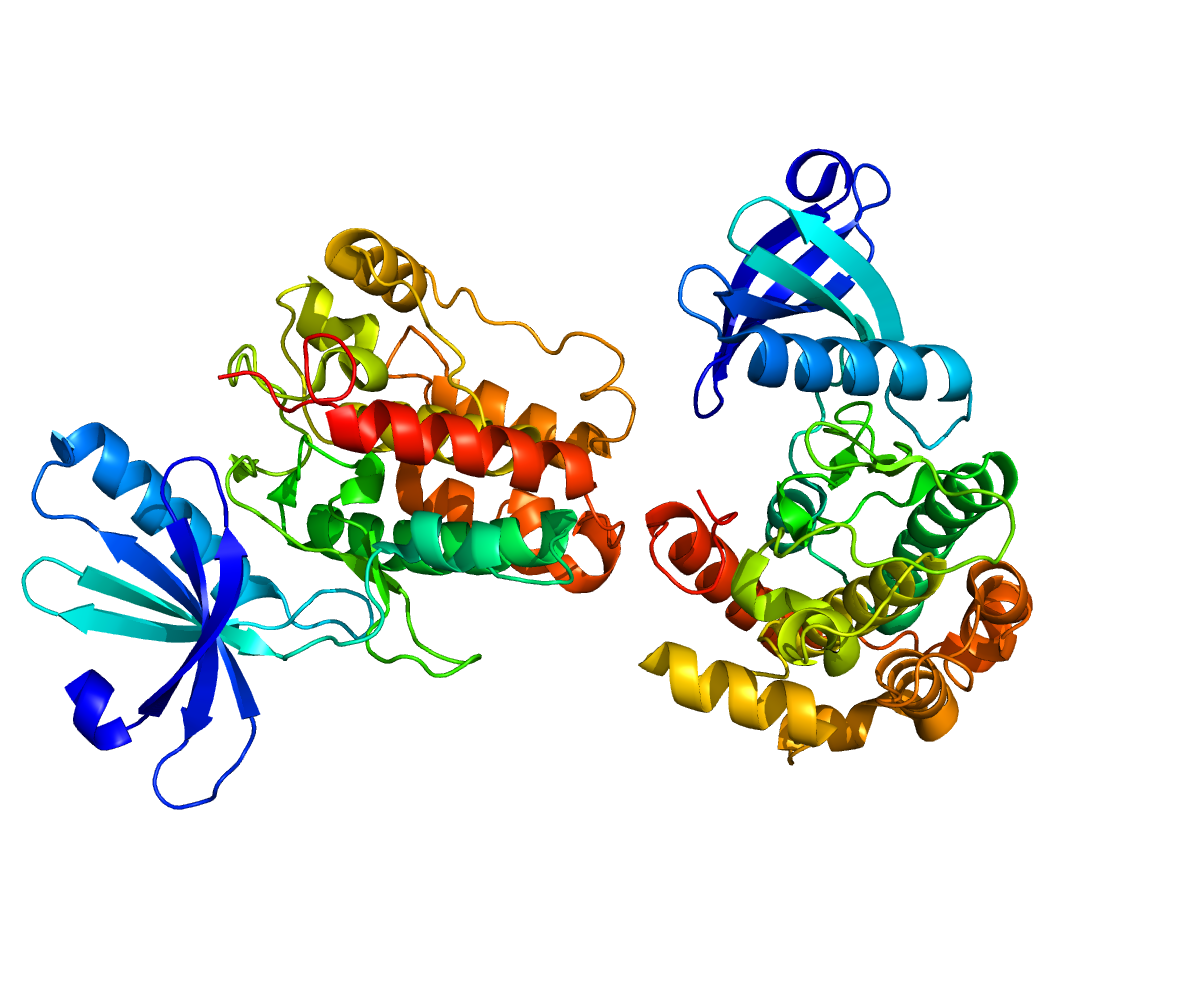
Available structures
PDB	Ortholog search: PDBe RCSB
PDB	List of PDB id codes 2VN9, 2W2C, 2WEL, 3GP2

Identifiers
- Aliases: CAMK2D, CAMKD, calcium/calmodulin dependent protein kinase II delta
- External IDs: OMIM: 607708; MGI: 1341265; HomoloGene: 55561; GeneCards: CAMK2D; OMA:CAMK2D - orthologs

Gene location (Human)
Chr.	Chromosome 4 (human)
Band	4q26	Start	113,418,054 bp
Band	4q26	End	113,761,927 bp

Gene location (Mouse)
Chr.	Chromosome 3 (mouse)
Band	3|3 G1- G2	Start	126,389,951 bp
Band	3|3 G1- G2	End	126,639,975 bp
RNA expression pattern
Bgee	Human / Mouse (ortholog); Top expressed in: myocardium of left ventricle; lateral nuclear group of thalamus; cardiac muscle tissue of right atrium; middle temporal gyrus; Brodmann area 23; right ventricle; entorhinal cortex; tibialis anterior muscle; deltoid muscle; endothelial cell / Top expressed in: anterior amygdaloid area; neural layer of retina; lobe of cerebellum; cerebellar vermis; lateral septal nucleus; medial geniculate nucleus; dorsomedial hypothalamic nucleus; atrium; lateral hypothalamus; ventral tegmental area; More reference expression data
BioGPS	n/a
Gene ontology
Molecular function	kinase activity; ATP binding; protein kinase activity; titin binding; transferase activity; protein homodimerization activity; protein binding; nucleotide binding; sodium channel inhibitor activity; calmodulin-dependent protein kinase activity; protein serine/threonine kinase activity; transmembrane transporter binding; calmodulin binding; identical protein binding
Cellular component	endocytic vesicle membrane; membrane; sarcoplasmic reticulum membrane; plasma membrane; nucleoplasm; sarcoplasmic reticulum; sarcolemma; neuron projection; nucleus; cytoplasm; cytosol; calcium channel complex
Biological process	regulation of heart contraction; interferon-gamma-mediated signaling pathway; regulation of transcription by RNA polymerase II; regulation of membrane depolarization; positive regulation of cardiac muscle hypertrophy; protein phosphorylation; cellular response to calcium ion; regulation of cardiac muscle cell action potential involved in regulation of contraction; regulation of histone deacetylase activity; regulation of cellular localization; negative regulation of sodium ion transmembrane transport; phosphorylation; regulation of the force of heart contraction; regulation of cardiac muscle contraction by regulation of the release of sequestered calcium ion; regulation of ryanodine-sensitive calcium-release channel activity; negative regulation of sodium ion transmembrane transporter activity; MAPK cascade; protein complex oligomerization; regulation of cell growth; regulation of cellular response to heat; regulation of cell communication by electrical coupling involved in cardiac conduction; regulation of heart rate by cardiac conduction; nervous system development; cell differentiation; regulation of cell communication by electrical coupling; positive regulation of cardiac muscle cell apoptotic process; regulation of release of sequestered calcium ion into cytosol by sarcoplasmic reticulum; peptidyl-serine phosphorylation; peptidyl-threonine phosphorylation; endoplasmic reticulum calcium ion homeostasis; protein autophosphorylation; relaxation of cardiac muscle; cardiac muscle cell contraction; regulation of cardiac muscle cell action potential; regulation of relaxation of cardiac muscle; regulation of calcium ion transmembrane transport via high voltage-gated calcium channel
Sources:Amigo / QuickGO
Orthologs
Species	Human	Mouse
Entrez	817	108058
Ensembl	ENSG00000145349	ENSMUSG00000053819
UniProt	Q13557	Q6PHZ2
RefSeq (mRNA)	NM_001221; NM_172114; NM_172115; NM_172127; NM_172128 NM_172129; NM_001321566; NM_001321567; NM_001321568; NM_001321569; NM_001321570; NM_001321571; NM_001321572; NM_001321573; NM_001321574; NM_001321575; NM_001321576; NM_001321577; NM_001321578; NM_001321579; NM_001321580; NM_001321581; NM_001321582; NM_001321583; NM_001321584; NM_001321585; NM_001321586; NM_001321587; NM_001321588; NM_001321589; NM_001321590; NM_001321591; NM_001321592; NM_001396964; NM_001396965; NM_001396966; NM_001396967; NM_001399855; NM_001399856; NM_001399857; NM_001399858; NM_001399859; NM_001399860; NM_001399861; NM_001399862; NM_001399863; NM_001399864; NM_001399865	NM_001025438; NM_001025439; NM_001293663; NM_001293664; NM_001293665 NM_001293666; NM_023813; NM_001346635; NM_001346636
RefSeq (protein)	NP_001212; NP_001308495; NP_001308496; NP_001308497; NP_001308498 NP_001308499; NP_001308500; NP_001308501; NP_001308502; NP_001308503; NP_001308504; NP_001308505; NP_001308506; NP_001308507; NP_001308508; NP_001308509; NP_001308510; NP_001308511; NP_001308512; NP_001308513; NP_001308514; NP_001308515; NP_001308516; NP_001308517; NP_001308518; NP_001308519; NP_001308520; NP_001308521; NP_742112; NP_742113; NP_742125; NP_742126; NP_742127	NP_001020609; NP_001020610; NP_001280592; NP_001280593; NP_001280594 NP_001280595; NP_001333564; NP_001333565; NP_076302
Location (UCSC)	Chr 4: 113.42 – 113.76 Mb	Chr 3: 126.39 – 126.64 Mb
PubMed search
- Wikidata
View/Edit Human	View/Edit Mouse

Calcium/calmodulin-dependent protein kinase type II delta chain is an enzyme that in humans is encoded by the CAMK2D gene.

The product of this gene belongs to the serine/threonine protein kinase family and to the Ca^{2+}/calmodulin-dependent protein kinase subfamily. Calcium signaling is crucial for several aspects of plasticity at glutamatergic synapses. In mammalian cells, the enzyme is composed of four different chains: alpha, beta, gamma, and delta. The product of this gene is a delta chain. Four alternatively spliced transcript variants that encode three different isoforms have been characterized to date. Distinct isoforms of this chain have different expression patterns.
