= RRAD (gene) =

Protein-coding gene in the species Homo sapiens

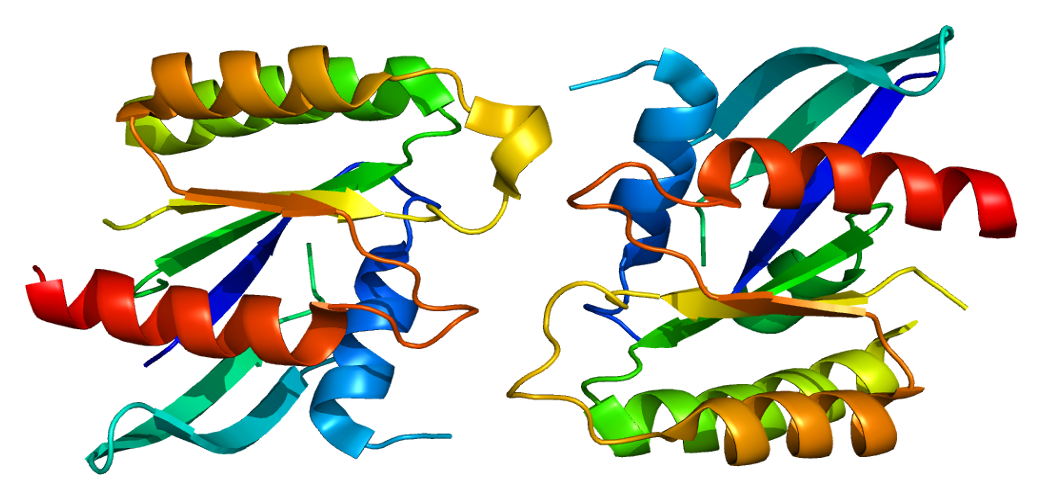

Identifiers
- Aliases: RRAD, RAD, RAD1, REM3, Ras related glycolysis inhibitor and calcium channel regulator
- External IDs: OMIM: 179503; MGI: 1930943; GeneCards: RRAD
Available structures
PDB	Ortholog search: PDBe RCSB
PDB	List of PDB id codes 2DPX, 2GJS, 3Q72, 3Q7P, 3Q7Q

Gene location (Human)
Chr.	Chromosome 16 (human)
Band	16q22.1	Start	66,921,679 bp
Band	16q22.1	End	66,925,536 bp

Gene location (Mouse)
Chr.	Chromosome 8 (mouse)
Band	8|8 D3	Start	105,354,702 bp
Band	8|8 D3	End	105,357,959 bp
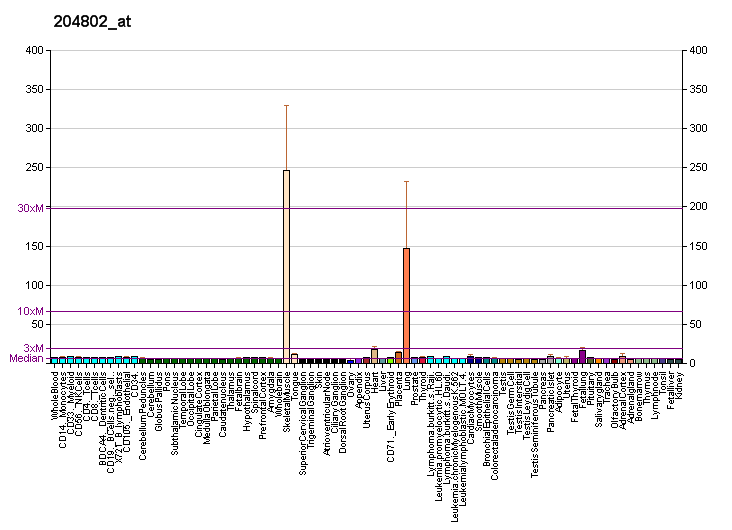

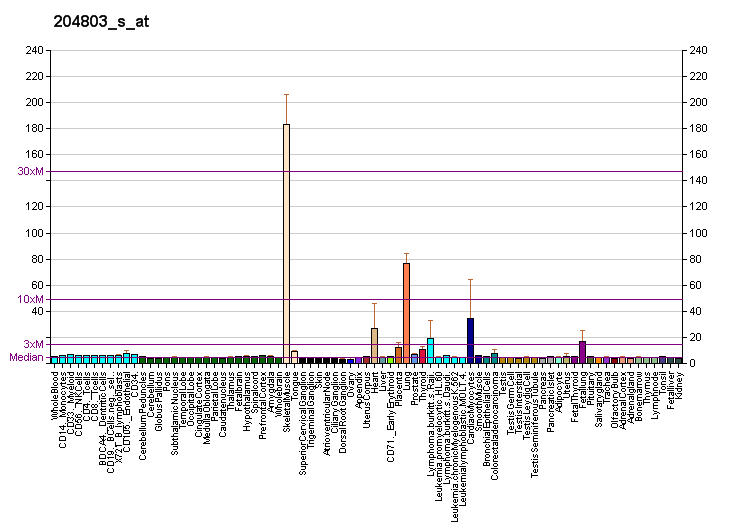
RNA expression pattern
Bgee	Human / Mouse (ortholog); Top expressed in: olfactory zone of nasal mucosa; Skeletal muscle tissue of rectus abdominis; right ventricle; apex of heart; gastrocnemius muscle; bronchial epithelial cell; right auricle of heart; triceps brachii muscle; muscle of thigh; left ventricle / Top expressed in: right ventricle; endocardial cushion; interventricular septum; cardiac muscle tissue of left ventricle; atrioventricular valve; ascending aorta; atrium; tunica media of zone of aorta; aortic valve; blastocyst; More reference expression data
BioGPS	More reference expression data
Gene ontology
Molecular function	nucleotide binding; GTP binding; protein binding; calmodulin binding; GTPase activity; calcium channel regulator activity
Cellular component	plasma membrane; membrane; intracellular anatomical structure
Biological process	signal transduction; small GTPase mediated signal transduction; regulation of high voltage-gated calcium channel activity; negative regulation of high voltage-gated calcium channel activity
Sources:Amigo / QuickGO
Orthologs
Databases	NCBI: entry; OMA: entry
Species	Human	Mouse
Entrez	6236	56437
Ensembl	ENSG00000166592	ENSMUSG00000031880
UniProt	P55042	O88667
RefSeq (mRNA)	NM_004165; NM_001128850	NM_019662
RefSeq (protein)	NP_001122322; NP_004156	n/a
Location (UCSC)	Chr 16: 66.92 – 66.93 Mb	Chr 8: 105.35 – 105.36 Mb
PubMed search
- Wikidata
View/Edit Human	View/Edit Mouse

Ras Related Glycolysis Inhibitor and Calcium Channel Regulator (RRAD) is a protein that in humans is encoded by the RRAD gene. RRAD is a Ras-related small GTPase that is regulated by p53 and plays a role in the regulation of aerobic glycolysis.

== Interactions ==
RRAD has been shown to interact with CAMK2G and TPM2.
