= CAMK1G =

Protein-coding gene in humans

Available structures
PDB	Ortholog search: PDBe RCSB
PDB	List of PDB id codes 2JAM

Identifiers
- Aliases: CAMK1G, CLICK3, CLICKIII, VWS1, dJ272L16.1, calcium/calmodulin dependent protein kinase IG
- External IDs: OMIM: 614994; MGI: 2388073; HomoloGene: 48706; GeneCards: CAMK1G; OMA:CAMK1G - orthologs

Gene location (Human)
Chr.	Chromosome 1 (human)
Band	1q32.2	Start	209,583,714 bp
Band	1q32.2	End	209,613,939 bp

Gene location (Mouse)
Chr.	Chromosome 1 (mouse)
Band	1 H6|1 97.74 cM	Start	193,028,654 bp
Band	1 H6|1 97.74 cM	End	193,052,606 bp
RNA expression pattern
Bgee	Human / Mouse (ortholog); Top expressed in: frontal pole; Brodmann area 10; right frontal lobe; Brodmann area 9; cingulate gyrus; anterior cingulate cortex; nucleus accumbens; middle frontal gyrus; Region I of hippocampus proper; superior frontal gyrus / Top expressed in: ventromedial nucleus; superior frontal gyrus; visual cortex; primary visual cortex; olfactory tubercle; pontine nuclei; primary motor cortex; central gray substance of midbrain; nucleus accumbens; nucleus of stria terminalis; More reference expression data
BioGPS	n/a
Gene ontology
Molecular function	transferase activity; nucleotide binding; protein kinase activity; protein serine/threonine kinase activity; catalytic activity; ATP binding; kinase activity; calmodulin-dependent protein kinase activity; calmodulin binding
Cellular component	cytoplasm; calcium- and calmodulin-dependent protein kinase complex; neuron projection; Golgi membrane; plasma membrane; Golgi apparatus; membrane; endomembrane system; intracellular anatomical structure
Biological process	protein phosphorylation; metabolism; phosphorylation; peptidyl-serine phosphorylation; peptidyl-threonine phosphorylation; intracellular signal transduction
Sources:Amigo / QuickGO
Orthologs
Species	Human	Mouse
Entrez	57172	215303
Ensembl	ENSG00000008118	ENSMUSG00000016179
UniProt	Q96NX5	Q91VB2
RefSeq (mRNA)	NM_020439	NM_144817
RefSeq (protein)	NP_065172	NP_659066
Location (UCSC)	Chr 1: 209.58 – 209.61 Mb	Chr 1: 193.03 – 193.05 Mb
PubMed search
- Wikidata
View/Edit Human	View/Edit Mouse

Calcium/calmodulin dependent protein kinase IG is a protein that in humans is encoded by the CAMK1G gene.

== Function ==
This gene encodes a protein similar to calcium/calmodulin dependent protein kinase, however, its exact function is not known. [provided by RefSeq, Jul 2008].
