= CAMK4 =

Protein-coding gene in humans

Available structures
| PDB | Ortholog search: PDBe RCSB |
| PDB | List of PDB id codes 2W4O |

Identifiers
- Aliases: CAMK4, CaMK IV, CaMK-GR, IV, caMK, calcium/calmodulin-dependent protein kinase IV, calcium/calmodulin dependent protein kinase IV, CaMKIV
- External IDs: OMIM: 114080; MGI: 88258; HomoloGene: 100780; GeneCards: CAMK4; OMA:CAMK4 - orthologs

Gene location (Human)
| Chr. | Chromosome 5 (human) |
| Band | 5q22.1 | Start | 111,223,653 bp |
| Band | 5q22.1 | End | 111,494,886 bp |

Gene location (Mouse)
| Chr. | Chromosome 18 (mouse) |
| Band | 18 B1|18 18.15 cM | Start | 33,067,984 bp |
| Band | 18 B1|18 18.15 cM | End | 33,324,281 bp |
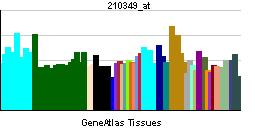
RNA expression pattern
| Bgee | Human / Mouse (ortholog); Top expressed in: cerebellar vermis; cerebellar hemisphere; right hemisphere of cerebellum; middle temporal gyrus; left testis; right testis; paraflocculus of cerebellum; ganglionic eminence; nucleus accumbens; superior frontal gyrus / Top expressed in: cerebellar cortex; superior frontal gyrus; thymus; primary visual cortex; lobe of cerebellum; seminiferous tubule; dentate gyrus of hippocampal formation granule cell; cerebellar vermis; spermatid; olfactory tubercle; More reference expression data |
| BioGPS | More reference expression data |
Gene ontology
| Molecular function | transferase activity; nucleotide binding; protein kinase activity; calcium-dependent protein serine/threonine kinase activity; calmodulin binding; kinase activity; protein serine/threonine kinase activity; calmodulin-dependent protein kinase activity; ATP binding |
| Cellular component | cytoplasm; cytosol; nucleoplasm; extracellular exosome; nucleus; fibrillar center; postsynapse; glutamatergic synapse |
| Biological process | intracellular signal transduction; adaptive immune response; myeloid dendritic cell cytokine production; phosphorylation; immune system process; myeloid dendritic cell differentiation; positive regulation of transcription, DNA-templated; regulation of T cell differentiation in thymus; protein phosphorylation; regulation of osteoclast differentiation; long-term memory; peptidyl-serine phosphorylation; protein autophosphorylation; inflammatory response; signal transduction |
Sources:Amigo / QuickGO
Orthologs
| Species | Human | Mouse |
| Entrez | 814 | 12326 |
| Ensembl | ENSG00000152495 | ENSMUSG00000038128 |
| UniProt | Q16566 | P08414; Q8BGR3 |
| RefSeq (mRNA) | NM_001744; NM_001323374; NM_001323375; NM_001323376; NM_001323377 | NM_009793 |
| RefSeq (protein) | NP_001310303; NP_001310304; NP_001310305; NP_001310306; NP_001735 | NP_033923 |
| Location (UCSC) | Chr 5: 111.22 – 111.49 Mb | Chr 18: 33.07 – 33.32 Mb |
| PubMed search |
- Wikidata
| View/Edit Human | View/Edit Mouse |

Calcium/calmodulin-dependent protein kinase type IV is an enzyme that in humans is encoded by the CAMK4 gene.

The product of this gene belongs to the serine/threonine protein kinase cluster, and to the Ca^{2+}/calmodulin-dependent protein kinase (CAMK) group. This enzyme is a multifunctional serine/threonine protein kinase with limited tissue distribution, that has been implicated in transcriptional regulation in lymphocytes, neurons, and male germ cells.
