= CAMK1D =

Protein-coding gene in humans

Available structures
PDB	Ortholog search: PDBe RCSB
PDB	List of PDB id codes 2JC6

Identifiers
- Aliases: CAMK1D, CKLiK, CaM-K1, CaMKID, calcium/calmodulin dependent protein kinase ID
- External IDs: OMIM: 607957; MGI: 2442190; HomoloGene: 121858; GeneCards: CAMK1D; OMA:CAMK1D - orthologs

Gene location (Human)
Chr.	Chromosome 10 (human)
Band	10p13	Start	12,349,547 bp
Band	10p13	End	12,835,545 bp

Gene location (Mouse)
Chr.	Chromosome 2 (mouse)
Band	2|2 A1	Start	5,298,268 bp
Band	2|2 A1	End	5,719,326 bp
RNA expression pattern
Bgee	Human / Mouse (ortholog); Top expressed in: middle temporal gyrus; parietal lobe; postcentral gyrus; Brodmann area 23; cerebellar vermis; superior frontal gyrus; entorhinal cortex; nipple; primary visual cortex; trigeminal ganglion / Top expressed in: olfactory tubercle; piriform cortex; primary motor cortex; medial geniculate nucleus; retinal pigment epithelium; dentate gyrus; subdivision of hippocampus; Region I of hippocampus proper; amygdala; anterior amygdaloid area; More reference expression data
BioGPS	n/a
Gene ontology
Molecular function	transferase activity; nucleotide binding; protein kinase activity; kinase activity; protein serine/threonine kinase activity; catalytic activity; ATP binding; calmodulin-dependent protein kinase activity; calmodulin binding
Cellular component	nucleus; cytoplasm
Biological process	regulation of granulocyte chemotaxis; positive regulation of phagocytosis; phosphorylation; negative regulation of apoptotic process; regulation of dendrite development; nervous system development; protein phosphorylation; positive regulation of CREB transcription factor activity; positive regulation of apoptotic process; metabolism; inflammatory response; positive regulation of respiratory burst; positive regulation of neutrophil chemotaxis; positive regulation of neuron projection development; peptidyl-serine phosphorylation; peptidyl-threonine phosphorylation; intracellular signal transduction
Sources:Amigo / QuickGO
Orthologs
Species	Human	Mouse
Entrez	57118	227541
Ensembl	ENSG00000183049	ENSMUSG00000039145
UniProt	Q8IU85	Q8BW96
RefSeq (mRNA)	NM_020397; NM_153498; NM_001351032	NM_001290374; NM_001290375; NM_001290376; NM_177343
RefSeq (protein)	NP_065130; NP_705718; NP_001337961	NP_001277303; NP_001277304; NP_001277305; NP_796317
Location (UCSC)	Chr 10: 12.35 – 12.84 Mb	Chr 2: 5.3 – 5.72 Mb
PubMed search
- Wikidata
View/Edit Human	View/Edit Mouse

Calcium/calmodulin-dependent protein kinase ID is a protein in humans that is encoded by the CAMK1D gene on chromosome 10 (locus 10p13).

== Function ==
This gene encodes a member of the Ca2+/calmodulin-dependent protein kinase 1 subfamily of serine/threonine kinases. The encoded protein may be involved in the regulation of granulocyte function through the chemokine signal transduction pathway. Alternatively spliced transcript variants encoding different isoforms of this gene have been described.
