= CAMK2B =

Protein-coding gene in humans

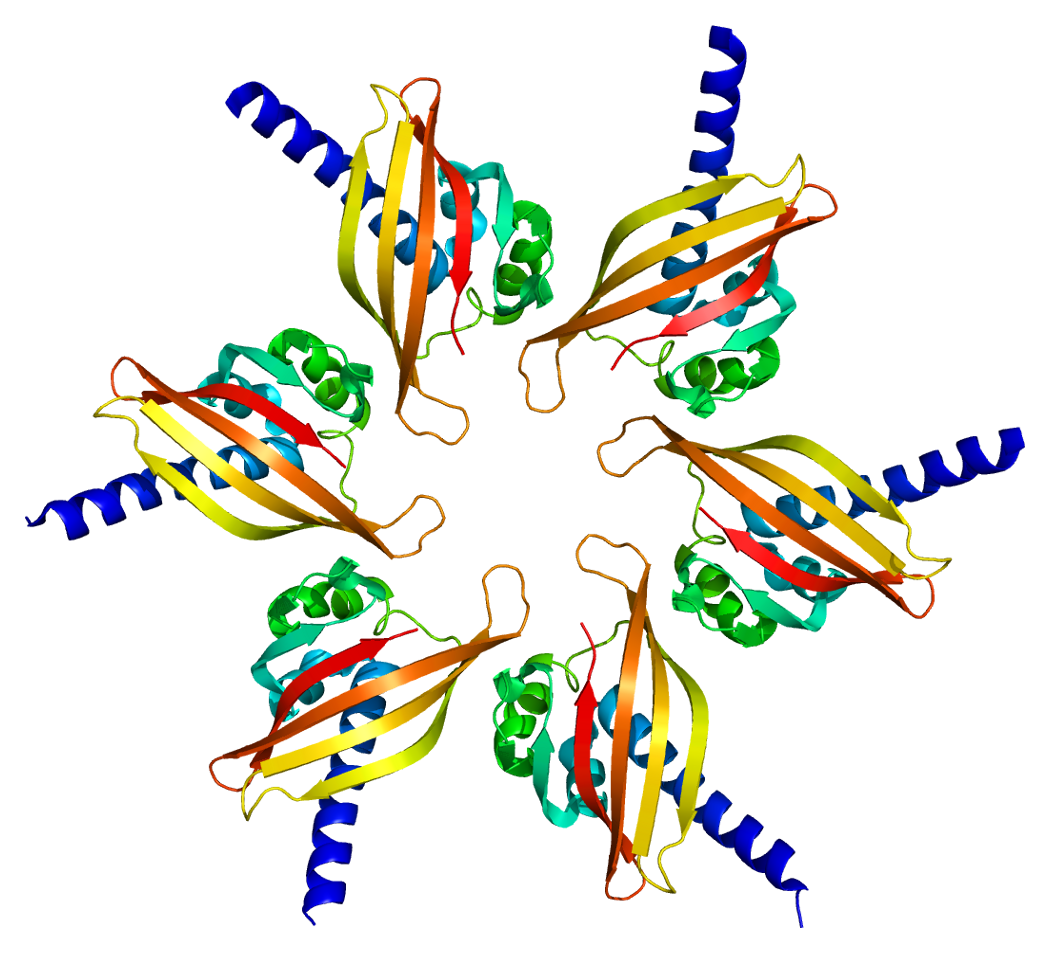
Available structures
PDB	Ortholog search: PDBe RCSB
PDB	List of PDB id codes 3BHH

Identifiers
- Aliases: CAMK2B, CAM2, CAMK2, CAMKB, calcium/calmodulin dependent protein kinase II beta, MRD54, CaMKIIbeta
- External IDs: OMIM: 607707; MGI: 88257; HomoloGene: 111050; GeneCards: CAMK2B; OMA:CAMK2B - orthologs

Gene location (Human)
Chr.	Chromosome 7 (human)
Band	7p13	Start	44,217,150 bp
Band	7p13	End	44,334,577 bp

Gene location (Mouse)
Chr.	Chromosome 11 (mouse)
Band	11 A1|11 3.89 cM	Start	5,919,644 bp
Band	11 A1|11 3.89 cM	End	6,016,362 bp
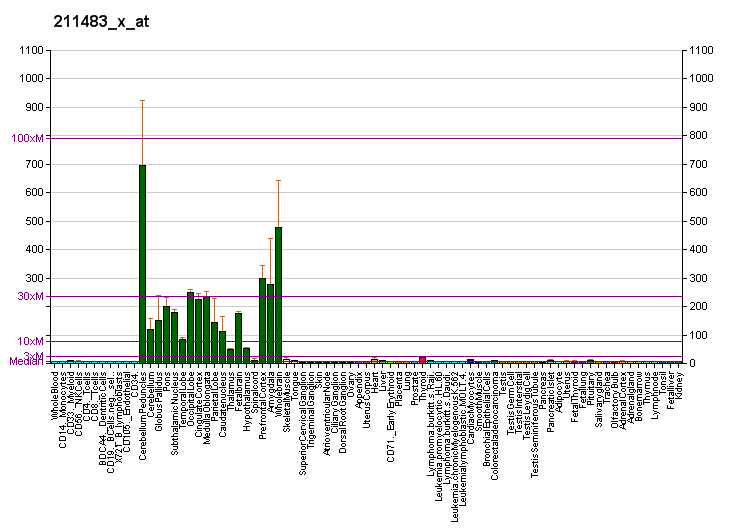

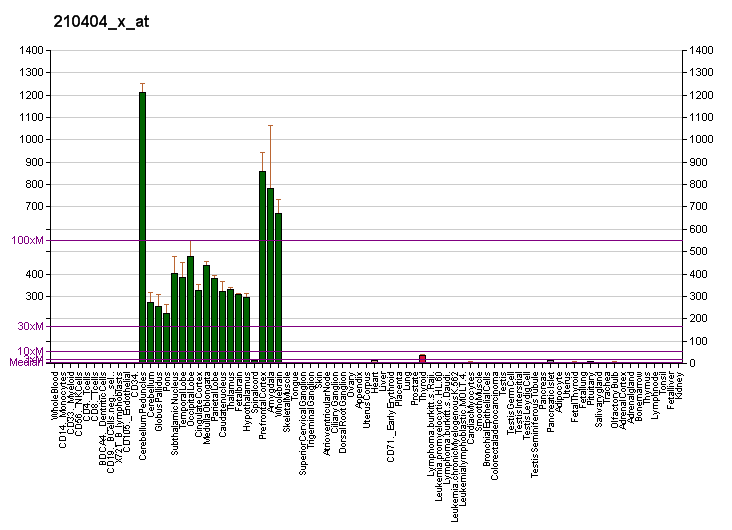

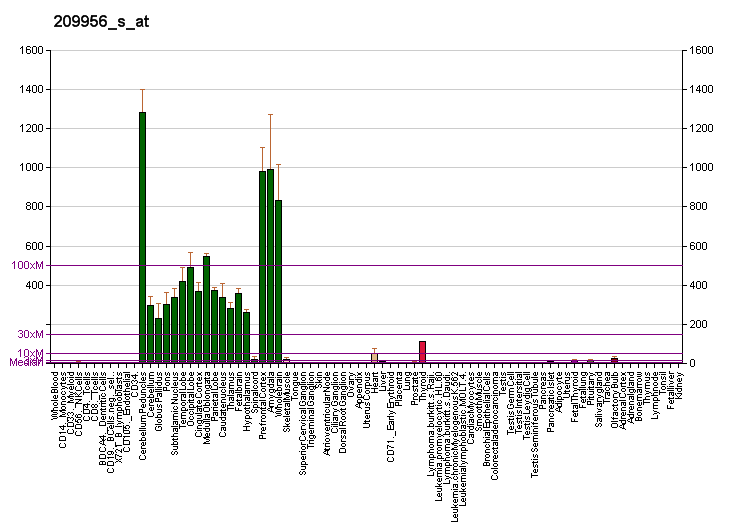
RNA expression pattern
Bgee	Human / Mouse (ortholog); Top expressed in: cerebellar cortex; cerebellar hemisphere; right hemisphere of cerebellum; cerebellar vermis; lateral nuclear group of thalamus; paraflocculus of cerebellum; nucleus accumbens; parietal lobe; Brodmann area 9; right frontal lobe / Top expressed in: dentate gyrus of hippocampal formation granule cell; CA3 field; superior frontal gyrus; primary visual cortex; entorhinal cortex; olfactory tubercle; perirhinal cortex; cerebellar cortex; hippocampus proper; nucleus accumbens; More reference expression data
BioGPS	More reference expression data
Gene ontology
Molecular function	transferase activity; nucleotide binding; protein kinase activity; protein homodimerization activity; kinase activity; protein binding; actin binding; ATP binding; protein serine/threonine kinase activity; calmodulin-dependent protein kinase activity; calmodulin binding; identical protein binding
Cellular component	endocytic vesicle membrane; cytosol; membrane; plasma membrane; nucleoplasm; microtubule organizing center; sarcoplasmic reticulum membrane; sarcoplasmic reticulum; cytoskeleton; cytoplasm; neuron projection; cell junction; synapse
Biological process	cell differentiation; regulation of synapse structural plasticity; regulation of calcium ion transport; regulation of long-term neuronal synaptic plasticity; interferon-gamma-mediated signaling pathway; phosphorylation; nervous system development; MAPK cascade; multicellular organism development; positive regulation of synapse maturation; protein phosphorylation; positive regulation of neuron projection development; protein autophosphorylation; regulation of skeletal muscle adaptation; positive regulation of dendritic spine morphogenesis; regulation of dendritic spine development; signal transduction; peptidyl-serine phosphorylation; peptidyl-threonine phosphorylation; intracellular signal transduction; regulation of neuron migration; regulation of cellular response to heat
Sources:Amigo / QuickGO
Orthologs
Species	Human	Mouse
Entrez	816	12323
Ensembl	ENSG00000058404	ENSMUSG00000057897
UniProt	Q13554	P28652
RefSeq (mRNA)	NM_001220; NM_001293170; NM_172078; NM_172079; NM_172080 NM_172081; NM_172082; NM_172083; NM_172084	NM_001174053; NM_001174054; NM_007595
RefSeq (protein)	NP_001211; NP_001280099; NP_742075; NP_742076; NP_742077 NP_742078; NP_742079; NP_742080; NP_742081	NP_001167524; NP_001167525; NP_031621
Location (UCSC)	Chr 7: 44.22 – 44.33 Mb	Chr 11: 5.92 – 6.02 Mb
PubMed search
- Wikidata
View/Edit Human	View/Edit Mouse

Calcium/calmodulin-dependent protein kinase type II beta chain is an enzyme that in humans is encoded by the CAMK2B gene.

== Function ==
The enzyme belongs to the serine/threonine protein kinase family and to the Ca^{2+}/calmodulin-dependent protein kinase subfamily. Calcium signalling is crucial for several aspects of plasticity at glutamatergic synapses. In mammalian cells, the enzyme is composed of four different chains: alpha, beta, gamma, and delta. The product of this gene is a beta chain. It is possible that distinct isoforms of this chain have different cellular localizations and interact differently with calmodulin. Eight transcript variants encoding eight distinct isoforms have been identified for this gene.

== Interactions ==
CAMK2B has been shown to interact with Actinin alpha 4.
