= CAMK2G =

Protein-coding gene in humans

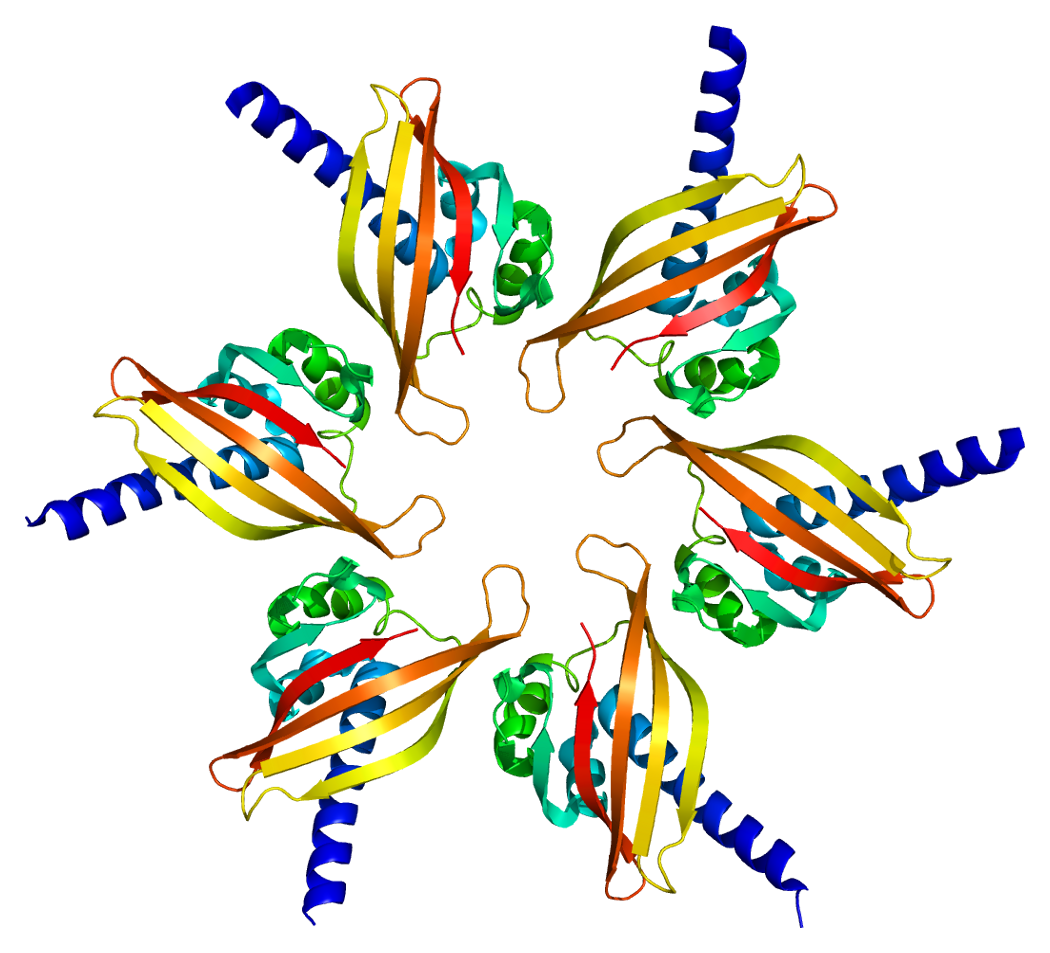
Available structures
PDB	Ortholog search: PDBe RCSB
PDB	List of PDB id codes 2UX0, 2V7O

Identifiers
- Aliases: CAMK2G, CAMK, CAMK-II, CAMKG, calcium/calmodulin dependent protein kinase II gamma
- External IDs: OMIM: 602123; MGI: 88259; HomoloGene: 15596; GeneCards: CAMK2G; OMA:CAMK2G - orthologs

Gene location (Human)
Chr.	Chromosome 10 (human)
Band	10q22.2	Start	73,812,501 bp
Band	10q22.2	End	73,874,591 bp

Gene location (Mouse)
Chr.	Chromosome 14 (mouse)
Band	14|14 A3	Start	20,734,875 bp
Band	14|14 A3	End	20,794,088 bp
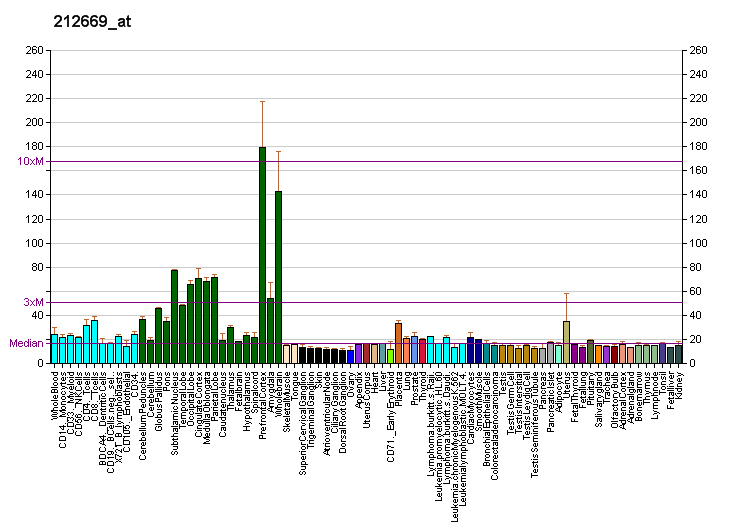

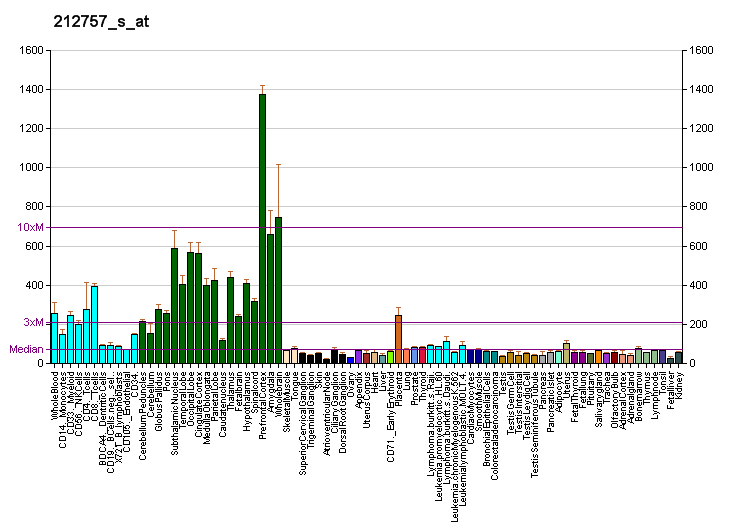
RNA expression pattern
Bgee	Human / Mouse (ortholog); Top expressed in: frontal pole; postcentral gyrus; right frontal lobe; popliteal artery; tibial arteries; Brodmann area 10; muscle layer of sigmoid colon; right coronary artery; lateral nuclear group of thalamus; primary visual cortex / Top expressed in: zygote; primary visual cortex; superior frontal gyrus; dentate gyrus of hippocampal formation granule cell; secondary oocyte; central gray substance of midbrain; muscle of thigh; triceps brachii muscle; primary motor cortex; pontine nuclei; More reference expression data
BioGPS	More reference expression data
Gene ontology
Molecular function	transferase activity; nucleotide binding; protein kinase activity; protein homodimerization activity; kinase activity; protein binding; calcium-dependent protein serine/threonine phosphatase activity; ATP binding; protein serine/threonine kinase activity; calmodulin-dependent protein kinase activity; calmodulin binding; identical protein binding
Cellular component	endocytic vesicle membrane; cytosol; membrane; plasma membrane; nucleoplasm; sarcoplasmic reticulum; sarcoplasmic reticulum membrane; cytoplasm; postsynaptic density; neuron projection
Biological process	regulation of calcium ion transport; phosphorylation; interferon-gamma-mediated signaling pathway; G1 phase; regulation of relaxation of cardiac muscle; insulin secretion; MAPK cascade; multicellular organism development; protein phosphorylation; protein complex oligomerization; regulation of cellular response to heat; protein autophosphorylation; regulation of skeletal muscle adaptation; calcium ion transport; protein dephosphorylation; nervous system development; peptidyl-serine phosphorylation; peptidyl-threonine phosphorylation; cell differentiation; intracellular signal transduction; regulation of molecular function
Sources:Amigo / QuickGO
Orthologs
Species	Human	Mouse
Entrez	818	12325
Ensembl	ENSG00000148660	ENSMUSG00000021820
UniProt	Q13555	Q923T9
RefSeq (mRNA)	NM_001204492; NM_001222; NM_172169; NM_172170; NM_172171 NM_172172; NM_172173; NM_001320898	NM_001039138; NM_001039139; NM_178597; NM_001360186
RefSeq (protein)	NP_001191421; NP_001213; NP_001307827; NP_751909; NP_751910 NP_751911; NP_751913; NP_001354443; NP_001354445; NP_001354446; NP_001354447; NP_001354448; NP_001354449; NP_001354450; NP_001354451; NP_001354452; NP_001354453; NP_001354454; NP_001354455; NP_001354456; NP_001354457; NP_001354458; NP_001354459; NP_001354460; NP_001354461; NP_001354462; NP_001354463; NP_001354464; NP_001354465; NP_001354466; NP_001354467; NP_001354468; NP_001354469; NP_001354470; NP_001354471; NP_001354472; NP_001354473; NP_001354474; NP_001354475; NP_001354476; NP_001354477	NP_001034227; NP_001034228; NP_848712; NP_001347115
Location (UCSC)	Chr 10: 73.81 – 73.87 Mb	Chr 14: 20.73 – 20.79 Mb
PubMed search
- Wikidata
View/Edit Human	View/Edit Mouse

Calcium/calmodulin-dependent protein kinase type II gamma chain is an enzyme that in humans is encoded by the CAMK2G gene.

== Function ==
The product of this gene belongs to the Serine/Threonine protein kinase family, and to the Ca(2+)/calmodulin-dependent protein kinase subfamily. Calcium signaling is crucial for several aspects of plasticity at glutamatergic synapses. In mammalian cells the enzyme is composed of four different chains: alpha, beta, gamma, and delta. The product of this gene is a gamma chain. Six alternatively spliced variants that encode six different isoforms have been characterized to date. Additional alternative splice variants that encode different isoforms have been described, but their full-length nature has not been determined.

== Interactions ==
CAMK2G has been shown to interact with RRAD.

== See also ==
- Ca2+/calmodulin-dependent protein kinase
