= Calcium/calmodulin-dependent protein kinase type II subunit alpha =

Protein found in humans

CAMK2A
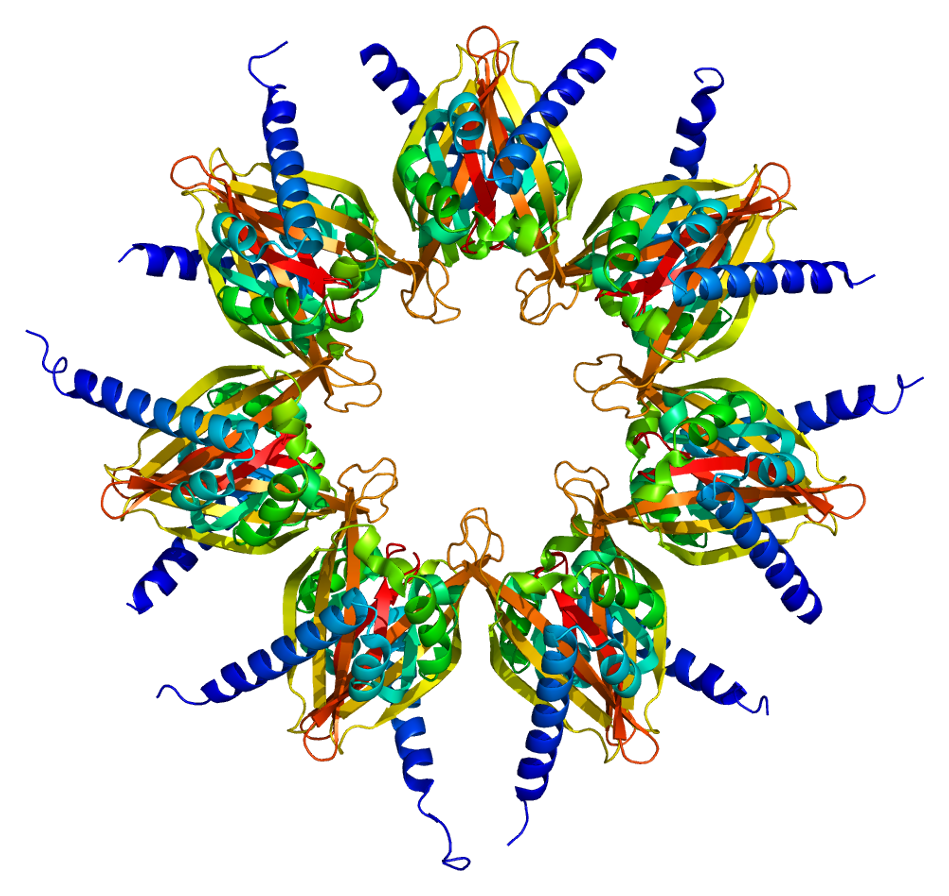
Available structures
PDB	Ortholog search: PDBe RCSB
PDB	List of PDB id codes 2VZ6, 3SOA, 5IG3

Identifiers
- Aliases: CAMK2A, CAMKA, calcium/calmodulin dependent protein kinase II alpha, MRD53, CaMKIINalpha, MRT63, CaMKIIalpha
- External IDs: OMIM: 114078; MGI: 88256; HomoloGene: 56577; GeneCards: CAMK2A; OMA:CAMK2A - orthologs

Gene location (Human)
Chr.	Chromosome 5 (human)
Band	5q32	Start	150,219,491 bp
Band	5q32	End	150,290,093 bp

Gene location (Mouse)
Chr.	Chromosome 18 (mouse)
Band	18 E1|18 34.41 cM	Start	61,058,690 bp
Band	18 E1|18 34.41 cM	End	61,121,224 bp
RNA expression pattern
Bgee	Human / Mouse (ortholog); Top expressed in: amygdala; prefrontal cortex; right frontal lobe; Region I of hippocampus proper; Brodmann area 9; cingulate gyrus; anterior cingulate cortex; frontal pole; orbitofrontal cortex; Brodmann area 46 / Top expressed in: dentate gyrus of hippocampal formation granule cell; superior frontal gyrus; lateral septal nucleus; olfactory tubercle; muscle of thigh; anterior amygdaloid area; piriform cortex; subiculum; primary visual cortex; perirhinal cortex; More reference expression data
BioGPS	n/a
Gene ontology
Molecular function	transferase activity; nucleotide binding; protein kinase activity; protein homodimerization activity; kinase activity; protein binding; glutamate receptor binding; ATP binding; metal ion binding; protein serine/threonine kinase activity; calmodulin binding; calmodulin-dependent protein kinase activity; calcium-dependent protein serine/threonine kinase activity; identical protein binding
Cellular component	endocytic vesicle membrane; cytosol; membrane; plasma membrane; synapse; nucleoplasm; cell junction; presynaptic membrane; nucleus; cytoplasm; mitochondrion; postsynaptic density; neuron projection; calcium- and calmodulin-dependent protein kinase complex; dendrite; cell projection; dendritic spine; postsynaptic membrane; Schaffer collateral - CA1 synapse
Biological process	phosphorylation; interferon-gamma-mediated signaling pathway; G1 phase; angiotensin-activated signaling pathway; positive regulation of cardiac muscle cell apoptotic process; regulation of neurotransmitter secretion; regulation of mitochondrial membrane permeability involved in apoptotic process; MAPK cascade; response to ischemia; positive regulation of NF-kappaB transcription factor activity; regulation of cellular response to heat; regulation of neuronal synaptic plasticity; protein autophosphorylation; calcium ion transport; positive regulation of calcium ion transport; dendrite morphogenesis; Wnt signaling pathway, calcium modulating pathway; nervous system development; peptidyl-serine phosphorylation; peptidyl-threonine phosphorylation; cell differentiation; intracellular signal transduction; protein phosphorylation; G1/S transition of mitotic cell cycle; dendritic spine development; regulation of synaptic vesicle docking; peptidyl-threonine autophosphorylation; regulation of neuron migration
Sources:Amigo / QuickGO
Orthologs
Species	Human	Mouse
Entrez	815	12322
Ensembl	ENSG00000070808	ENSMUSG00000024617
UniProt	Q9UQM7	P11798
RefSeq (mRNA)	NM_171825; NM_015981; NM_001363989; NM_001363990; NM_001369025	NM_001286809; NM_009792; NM_177407
RefSeq (protein)	NP_057065; NP_741960; NP_001350918; NP_001350919; NP_001355954	NP_001273738; NP_033922; NP_803126; NP_001390238; NP_001390241
Location (UCSC)	Chr 5: 150.22 – 150.29 Mb	Chr 18: 61.06 – 61.12 Mb
PubMed search
- Wikidata
View/Edit Human	View/Edit Mouse

Calcium/calmodulin-dependent protein kinase type II subunit alpha (CAMKIIα), a.k.a. Ca^{2+}/calmodulin-dependent protein kinase II alpha, is one subunit of CamKII, a protein kinase (i.e., an enzyme which phosphorylates proteins) that in humans is encoded by the CAMK2A gene.

== Function ==
The product of the CAMK2A gene is an enzyme that belongs to the serine/threonine-specific protein kinase family, as well as the Ca^{2+}/calmodulin-dependent protein kinase II subfamily. Ca^{2+} signaling is crucial for several aspects of synaptic plasticity at glutamatergic synapses. This enzyme is composed of four different chains: alpha, beta, gamma, and delta. The alpha chain encoded by this gene is required for hippocampal long-term potentiation (LTP) and spatial learning. In addition to its calcium-calmodulin (CaM)-dependent activity, this protein can undergo autophosphorylation, resulting in CaM-independent activity. Two transcript variants encoding distinct isoforms have been identified for this gene. According to a 2018 study by Bruno Reversade, the recessive mutation of CAMK2A in humans cause a syndrome of severe intellectual disability with growth retardation.

== Interactions ==
CAMK2A has been shown to interact with:

- Actinin alpha 4,
- CDK5R1, and
- DLG1.
