= EEF2K =

Protein-coding gene in humans

Identifiers
- Aliases: EEF2K, HSU93850, eEF-2K, eukaryotic elongation factor 2 kinase, CAMKIII, calmodulin-dependent protein kinase III
- External IDs: OMIM: 606968; MGI: 1195261; GeneCards: EEF2K
Enzyme activity
EC #	BRENDA	ExPASy	KEGG	MetaCyc
2.7.11.20	↗	↗	↗	↗

Gene location (Human)
Chr.	Chromosome 16 (human)
Band	16p12.2	Start	22,206,278 bp
Band	16p12.2	End	22,288,738 bp

Gene location (Mouse)
Chr.	Chromosome 7 (mouse)
Band	7|7 F2	Start	120,442,054 bp
Band	7|7 F2	End	120,506,673 bp
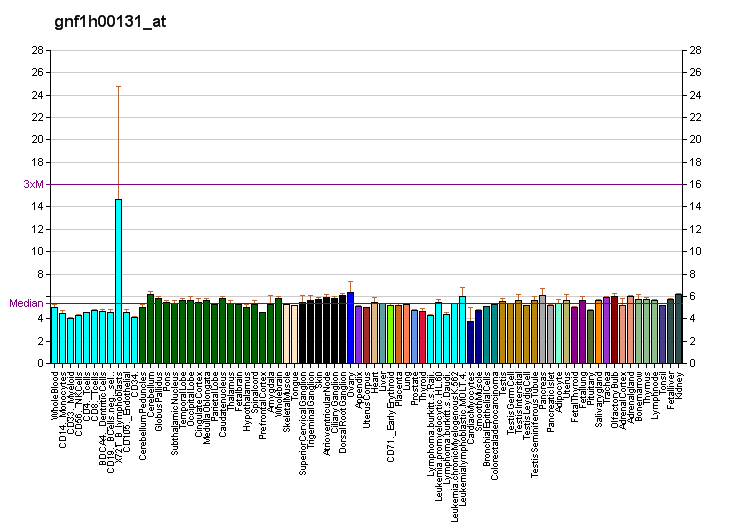

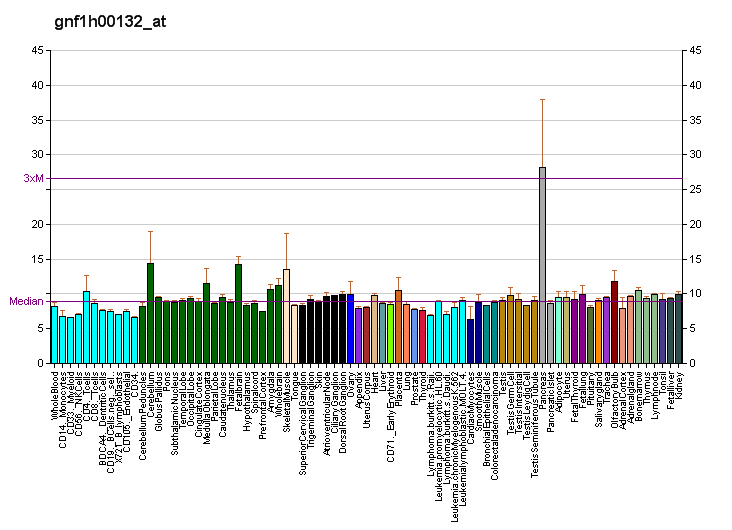
RNA expression pattern
Bgee	Human / Mouse (ortholog); Top expressed in: skin of leg; sural nerve; skin of abdomen; muscle of thigh; cerebellum; cerebellar cortex; cerebellar hemisphere; skeletal muscle tissue; right hemisphere of cerebellum; gastric mucosa / Top expressed in: ascending aorta; primary oocyte; aortic valve; secondary oocyte; zygote; seminal vesicula; urothelium; urinary bladder; transitional epithelium of urinary bladder; medullary collecting duct; More reference expression data
BioGPS	More reference expression data
Gene ontology
Molecular function	nucleotide binding; calcium ion binding; protein kinase activity; transferase activity; protein serine/threonine kinase activity; kinase activity; translation factor activity, RNA binding; calmodulin binding; ATP binding; elongation factor-2 kinase activity
Cellular component	cytoplasm; cytosol; postsynaptic density; dendritic spine
Biological process	positive regulation of endocytosis; cellular response to cAMP; response to ischemia; negative regulation of apoptotic process; cellular response to insulin stimulus; positive regulation of synapse assembly; translational elongation; cellular response to calcium ion; protein autophosphorylation; cellular response to brain-derived neurotrophic factor stimulus; cellular response to anoxia; protein phosphorylation; positive regulation of dendritic spine morphogenesis; regulation of protein autophosphorylation; response to prolactin; phosphorylation
Sources:Amigo / QuickGO
Orthologs
Databases	NCBI: entry; OMA: entry
Species	Human	Mouse
Entrez	29904	13631
Ensembl	ENSG00000103319; ENSG00000284161	ENSMUSG00000035064
UniProt	O00418	O08796
RefSeq (mRNA)	NM_013302	NM_001267710; NM_001267711; NM_007908
RefSeq (protein)	NP_037434	NP_001254639; NP_001254640; NP_031934
Location (UCSC)	Chr 16: 22.21 – 22.29 Mb	Chr 7: 120.44 – 120.51 Mb
PubMed search
- Wikidata
View/Edit Human	View/Edit Mouse

Eukaryotic elongation factor-2 kinase (eEF-2 kinase or eEF-2K), also known as calmodulin-dependent protein kinase III (CAMKIII) and calcium/calmodulin-dependent eukaryotic elongation factor 2 kinase, is an enzyme that in humans is encoded by the EEF2K gene.

== Function ==
eEF-2 kinase is a highly conserved protein kinase in the calmodulin-mediated signaling pathway that links multiple up-stream signals to the regulation of protein synthesis. It phosphorylates eukaryotic elongation factor 2 (EEF2) and thus inhibits the EEF2 function.

== Activation ==
The activity of eEF-2K is dependent on calcium and calmodulin. Activation of eEF-2K proceeds by a sequential two-step mechanism. First, calcium-calmodulin binds with high affinity to activate the kinase domain, triggering rapid autophosphorylation of Thr-348. In the second step, autophosphorylation of Thr-348 leads to a conformational change in the kinase likely supported by the binding of phospho-Thr-348 to an allosteric phosphate binding pocket in the kinase domain. This increases the activity of eEF-2K against its substrate, elongation factor 2.

eEF-2K can gain calcium-independent activity through autophosphorylation of Ser-500. However, calmodulin must remain bound to the enzyme for its activity to be sustained.

== Clinical significance ==
The activity of this kinase is increased in many cancers and may be a valid target for anti-cancer treatment.

It is also suggested that eEF-2K may play a role the rapid anti-depressant effects of ketamine through its regulation of neuronal protein synthesis.

== Cancer ==
eEF-2K expression is often upregulated in cancer cells, including breast and pancreatic cancers and promotes cell proliferation, survival, motility/migration, invasion and tumorigenesis.
