= CAMK1 =

Protein-coding gene in humans

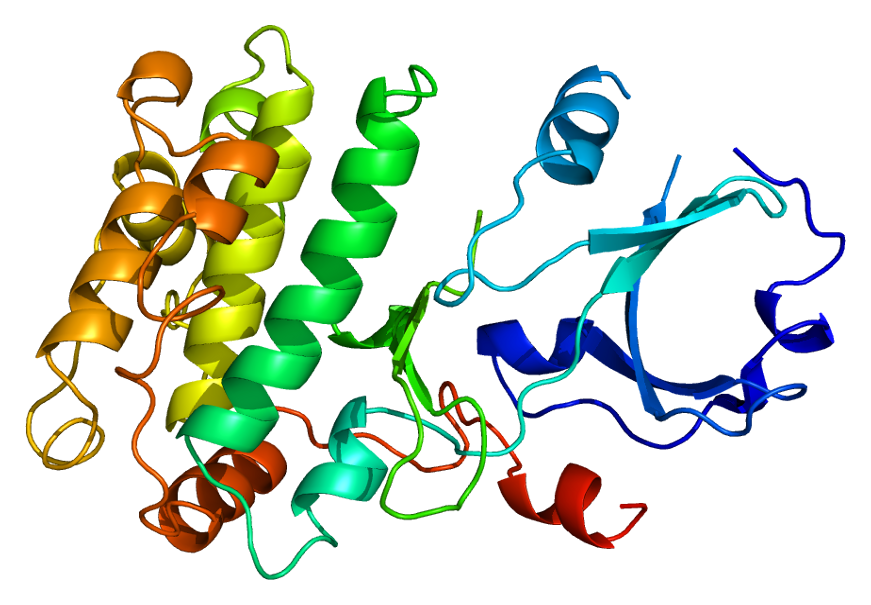
Available structures
| PDB | Ortholog search: PDBe RCSB |
| PDB | List of PDB id codes 4FG7, 4FG8, 4FG9, 4FGB |

Identifiers
- Aliases: CAMK1, CAMKI, calcium/calmodulin dependent protein kinase I, CaMKI-alpha, CaM kinase I alpha
- External IDs: OMIM: 604998; MGI: 1098535; HomoloGene: 117458; GeneCards: CAMK1; OMA:CAMK1 - orthologs

Gene location (Human)
| Chr. | Chromosome 3 (human) |
| Band | 3p25.3 | Start | 9,757,347 bp |
| Band | 3p25.3 | End | 9,769,992 bp |

Gene location (Mouse)
| Chr. | Chromosome 6 (mouse) |
| Band | 6 E3|6 52.75 cM | Start | 113,311,085 bp |
| Band | 6 E3|6 52.75 cM | End | 113,320,945 bp |
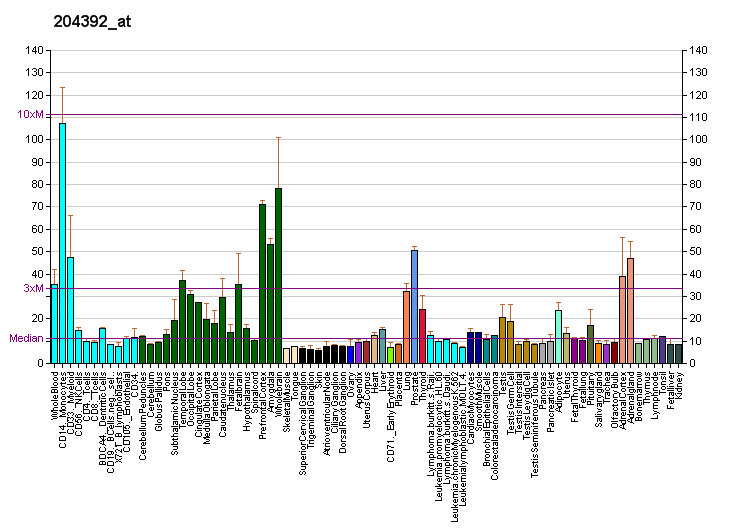
RNA expression pattern
| Bgee | Human / Mouse (ortholog); Top expressed in: right adrenal cortex; left adrenal cortex; right frontal lobe; nucleus accumbens; prefrontal cortex; caudate nucleus; monocyte; amygdala; left uterine tube; putamen / Top expressed in: superior frontal gyrus; stroma of bone marrow; primary visual cortex; external carotid artery; dorsomedial hypothalamic nucleus; internal carotid artery; right kidney; arcuate nucleus; myocardium of ventricle; dentate gyrus of hippocampal formation granule cell; More reference expression data |
| BioGPS | More reference expression data |
Gene ontology
| Molecular function | transferase activity; nucleotide binding; protein kinase activity; kinase activity; protein serine/threonine kinase activity; protein binding; catalytic activity; ATP binding; calmodulin-dependent protein kinase activity; calmodulin binding |
| Cellular component | cytoplasm; nucleus; intracellular anatomical structure; postsynaptic density; glutamatergic synapse; cytosol |
| Biological process | cell differentiation; positive regulation of synapse structural plasticity; positive regulation of muscle cell differentiation; regulation of muscle cell differentiation; phosphorylation; positive regulation of syncytium formation by plasma membrane fusion; regulation of histone H3-K9 acetylation; negative regulation of protein binding; positive regulation of dendritic spine development; nervous system development; positive regulation of peptidyl-serine phosphorylation; positive regulation of protein serine/threonine kinase activity; positive regulation of protein acetylation; regulation of protein localization; positive regulation of protein export from nucleus; multicellular organism development; protein phosphorylation; nucleocytoplasmic transport; positive regulation of neuron projection development; cell cycle; metabolism; regulation of protein binding; positive regulation of transcription by RNA polymerase II; signal transduction; peptidyl-threonine phosphorylation; intracellular signal transduction; regulation of synapse organization |
Sources:Amigo / QuickGO
Orthologs
| Species | Human | Mouse |
| Entrez | 8536 | 52163 |
| Ensembl | ENSG00000134072 | ENSMUSG00000030272 |
| UniProt | Q14012 | Q91YS8 |
| RefSeq (mRNA) | NM_003656 | NM_133926 |
| RefSeq (protein) | NP_003647; NP_003647.1 | NP_598687 |
| Location (UCSC) | Chr 3: 9.76 – 9.77 Mb | Chr 6: 113.31 – 113.32 Mb |
| PubMed search |
- Wikidata
| View/Edit Human | View/Edit Mouse |

Calcium/calmodulin-dependent protein kinase type 1 is an enzyme that in humans is encoded by the CAMK1 gene.

Calcium/calmodulin-dependent protein kinase I is expressed in many tissues and is a component of a calmodulin-dependent protein kinase cascade. Calcium/calmodulin directly activates calcium/calmodulin-dependent protein kinase I by binding to the enzyme and indirectly promotes the phosphorylation and synergistic activation of the enzyme by calcium/calmodulin-dependent protein kinase I kinase.
