= Calbindin 1 =

Protein found in humans

CALB1

Identifiers
- Aliases: CALB1, CALB, D-28K, calbindin 1
- External IDs: OMIM: 114050; MGI: 88248; GeneCards: CALB1

Gene location (Human)
Chr.	Chromosome 8 (human)
Band	8q21.3	Start	90,058,608 bp
Band	8q21.3	End	90,095,475 bp

Gene location (Mouse)
Chr.	Chromosome 4 (mouse)
Band	4 A2|4 6.66 cM	Start	15,881,264 bp
Band	4 A2|4 6.66 cM	End	15,908,064 bp
RNA expression pattern
Bgee	Human / Mouse (ortholog); Top expressed in: kidney tubule; cerebellar vermis; nucleus accumbens; glomerulus; metanephric glomerulus; caudate nucleus; human kidney; right hemisphere of cerebellum; renal medulla; lateral nuclear group of thalamus / Top expressed in: molar; cerebellar vermis; lobe of cerebellum; ventromedial nucleus; mammillary body; medial dorsal nucleus; paraventricular nucleus of hypothalamus; medial geniculate nucleus; anterior amygdaloid area; arcuate nucleus; More reference expression data
BioGPS	n/a
Gene ontology
Molecular function	calcium ion binding; zinc ion binding; metal ion binding; protein binding; vitamin D binding; calcium ion binding involved in regulation of presynaptic cytosolic calcium ion concentration; calcium ion binding involved in regulation of postsynaptic cytosolic calcium ion concentration
Cellular component	cytoplasm; cell body; synapse; intracellular anatomical structure; axon; terminal bouton; soma; dendrite; neuron projection; extracellular exosome; nucleus; cytosol; dendritic spine; calyx of Held; hippocampal mossy fiber to CA3 synapse; postsynapse; glutamatergic synapse; GABA-ergic synapse; presynaptic cytosol; postsynaptic cytosol; stereocilium; cuticular plate
Biological process	cellular response to organic substance; retina layer formation; regulation of cytosolic calcium ion concentration; calcium ion homeostasis; locomotory behavior; metanephric distal convoluted tubule development; regulation of synaptic plasticity; metanephric part of ureteric bud development; long-term memory; metanephric connecting tubule development; retina development in camera-type eye; short-term memory; learning or memory; metanephric collecting duct development; regulation of presynaptic cytosolic calcium ion concentration; regulation of long-term synaptic potentiation; regulation of postsynaptic cytosolic calcium ion concentration; cochlea development
Sources:Amigo / QuickGO
Orthologs
Databases	NCBI: entry; OMA: entry
Species	Human	Mouse
Entrez	793	12307
Ensembl	ENSG00000104327	ENSMUSG00000028222
UniProt	P05937	P12658
RefSeq (mRNA)	NM_004929; NM_001366795	NM_009788
RefSeq (protein)	NP_004920; NP_001353724	NP_033918
Location (UCSC)	Chr 8: 90.06 – 90.1 Mb	Chr 4: 15.88 – 15.91 Mb
PubMed search
- Wikidata
View/Edit Human	View/Edit Mouse

Calbindin 1 is a protein that in humans is encoded by the CALB1 gene. It belongs to the calbindin family of calcium-binding proteins, along with calretinin (CALB2).

== Function ==
The protein encoded by this gene is a member of the calcium-binding protein superfamily that includes calmodulin and troponin C. Originally described as a 27 kDa protein, it is now known to be a 28 kDa protein. It contains four active calcium-binding domains, and has two modified domains that are thought to have lost their calcium binding capability. This protein is thought to buffer entry of calcium upon stimulation of glutamate receptors. Depletion of this protein was noted in patients with Huntington disease. [provided by RefSeq, Jan 2015].
