= Calbindin =

Protein

calbindin 1, 28kDa
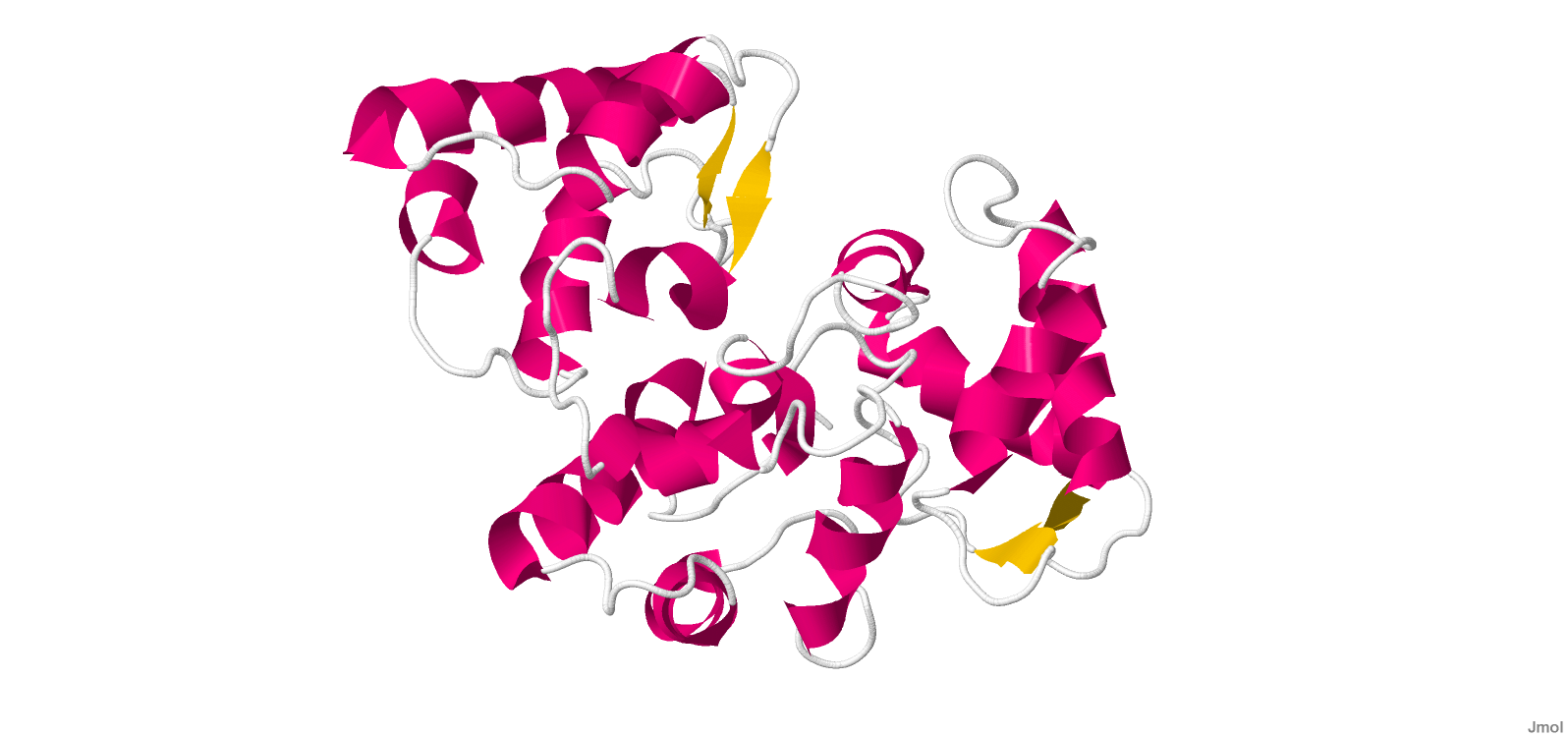
- NMR solution structure of Ca^{2+}-loaded calbindin D28K.

Identifiers
- Symbol: CALB1
- Alt. symbols: CALB
- NCBI gene: 793
- HGNC: 1434
- OMIM: 114050
- RefSeq: NM_004929
- UniProt: P05937

Other data
- Locus: Chr. 8 p11
Search for
- Structures: Swiss-model
- Domains: InterPro

calbindin 2, 29kDa (calretinin)

Identifiers
- Symbol: CALB2
- NCBI gene: 794
- HGNC: 1435
- OMIM: 114051
- RefSeq: NM_001740
- UniProt: P22676

Other data
- Locus: Chr. 16 q22.1
Search for
- Structures: Swiss-model
- Domains: InterPro

Calbindins are three different calcium-binding proteins: calbindin, calretinin and S100G. They were originally described as vitamin D-dependent calcium-binding proteins in the intestine and kidney of chicks and mammals. They are now classified in different subfamilies as they differ in the number of Ca^{2+} binding EF hands.

== Calbindin 1 ==
Calbindin 1 or simply calbindin was first shown to be present in the intestine in birds and then found in the mammalian kidney. It is also expressed in a number of neuronal and endocrine cells, particularly in the cerebellum. It is a 28 kDa protein encoded in humans by the CALB1 gene.

Calbindin contains 4 active calcium-binding domains, and 2 modified domains that have lost their calcium-binding capacity. Calbindin acts as a calcium buffer and calcium sensor and can hold four Ca^{2+} in the EF-hands of loops EF1, EF3, EF4 and EF5. The structure of rat calbindin was originally solved by nuclear magnetic resonance and was one of the largest proteins then to be determined by this technique. The sequence of calbindin is 263 residues in length and has only one chain. The sequence consists mostly of alpha helices but beta sheets are not absent. According to the NMR PDB (PDB entry 2G9B) it is 44% helical with 14 helices containing 117 residues, and 4% beta sheet with 9 strands containing 13 residues.

In 2018 the X-ray crystal structure of human calbindin was published (PDB entry 6FIE). There were differences observed between the nuclear magnetic resonance and crystal structure despite 98% sequence identity between the rat and human isoforms. Small angle X-ray scattering indicates that the crystal structure better predicts the properties of calbindin in solution compared with the structure determined by nuclear magnetic resonance.

Calbindin is a vitamin D–responsive gene in many tissues, in particular the chick intestine, where it has a clear function in mediating calcium absorption. In the brain, its synthesis is independent of vitamin-D.

== Calbindin 2 (calretinin) ==
Calretinin, also known as calbindin 2, is a 29 kDa protein with 58% homology to calbindin 1 and principally found in nervous tissues. It is encoded in humans by the CALB2 gene and was formerly known as calbindin-D29k.

== Calbindin 3 (s100g) ==
S100G, formerly calbindin 3 and calbindin-D9k, is present in mammalian enterocytes (epithelial cells of the intestine). S100G can also be found in the kidney and uterus in some mammalian species. It is encoded in humans by the S100G gene which has also been termed CALB3. Nonetheless, there is no homology between calbindin 1 and S100G, apart from their calcium binding domains (EF-hands): S100G has two EF-hands, and calbindin 1 has six. Unlike calbindin 1 and 2, S100G is a member of the S100 family of calcium-binding proteins.

S100G mediates the transport of calcium across the enterocytes from the apical side, where entry is regulated by the calcium channel TRPV6, to the basolateral side, where calcium pumps such as PMCA1 utilize intracellular adenosine triphosphate to pump calcium into the blood. The transport of calcium across the enterocyte cytoplasm appears to be rate-limiting for calcium absorption in the intestine; the presence of calbindin increases the amount of calcium crossing the cell without raising the free concentration. S100G may also stimulate the basolateral calcium-pumping ATPases. Expression of S100G, like that of calbindin 1, is stimulated by the active vitamin D metabolite, calcitriol although the precise mechanisms are still controversial. In mice in which the vitamin D receptor is not expressed, S100G is less abundant, but not absent.

== Discovery ==
Vitamin D-dependent calcium binding proteins were discovered in the cytosolic fractions of chicken intestine, and later in mammalian intestine and kidney, by researchers including Robert Wasserman of Cornell University. Such proteins bound calcium in the micromolar range and were greatly reduced in vitamin D-deficient animals. Expression could be induced by treating these animals with vitamin D metabolites such as calcitriol.

They were found to exist in two distinct sizes with a molecular weight of approximately 9 kDa and 28 kDa, and they were renamed calbindins.
