= Sarcalumenin =

Protein-coding gene in the species Homo sapiens

SRL

Identifiers
- Aliases: SRL, entrez:6345, sarcalumenin, SAR
- External IDs: OMIM: 604992; MGI: 2146620; HomoloGene: 45500; GeneCards: SRL; OMA:SRL - orthologs

Gene location (Human)
Chr.	Chromosome 16 (human)
Band	16p13.3	Start	4,189,374 bp
Band	16p13.3	End	4,242,080 bp

Gene location (Mouse)
Chr.	Chromosome 16 (mouse)
Band	16|16 A1	Start	4,298,080 bp
Band	16|16 A1	End	4,359,680 bp
RNA expression pattern
Bgee	Human / Mouse (ortholog); Top expressed in: muscle of thigh; gastrocnemius muscle; myocardium of left ventricle; Skeletal muscle tissue of rectus abdominis; apex of heart; quadriceps femoris muscle; vastus lateralis muscle; cardiac muscle tissue of right atrium; right auricle of heart; Skeletal muscle tissue of biceps brachii / Top expressed in: interventricular septum; sternocleidomastoid muscle; triceps brachii muscle; temporal muscle; vastus lateralis muscle; extraocular muscle; muscle of thigh; medial head of gastrocnemius muscle; ankle; digastric muscle; More reference expression data
BioGPS	n/a
Gene ontology
Molecular function	GTP binding
Cellular component	sarcoplasmic reticulum; sarcoplasmic reticulum lumen
Biological process	store-operated calcium entry; response to muscle activity involved in regulation of muscle adaptation
Sources:Amigo / QuickGO
Orthologs
Species	Human	Mouse
Entrez	6345	106393
Ensembl	ENSG00000185739	ENSMUSG00000022519
UniProt	Q86TD4	Q7TQ48
RefSeq (mRNA)	NM_001098814; NM_001323667; NM_001323668	NM_175347; NM_001347162; NM_001361474
RefSeq (protein)	NP_001092284; NP_001310596; NP_001310597	NP_001334091; NP_780556; NP_001348403
Location (UCSC)	Chr 16: 4.19 – 4.24 Mb	Chr 16: 4.3 – 4.36 Mb
PubMed search
- Wikidata
View/Edit Human	View/Edit Mouse

Sarcalumenin is a protein that in humans is encoded by the SRL gene.

Sarcalumenin is a calcium-binding protein that can be found in the sarcoplasmic reticulum of striated muscle. Sarcalumenin is partially responsible for calcium buffering in the lumen of the sarcoplasmic reticulum and helps out calcium pump proteins. Additionally, sarcalumenin is necessary for keeping a normal sinus rhythm during both aerobic and anaerobic exercise activity. Sarcalumenin is a calcium-binding glycoprotein composed of 473 acidic amino acids with a molecular weight of 160 KDa. Together along with other luminal calcium buffer proteins, sarcalumenin plays an important role in regulation of calcium uptake and release during excitation-contraction coupling (ECC) in muscle fibers.
