= CALML5 =

Protein-coding gene in humans

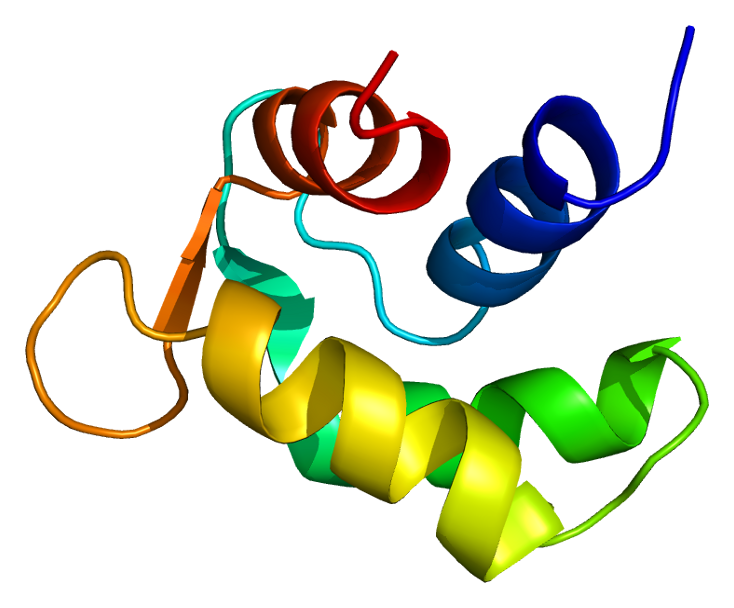

Identifiers
- Aliases: CALML5, CLSP, calmodulin like 5
- External IDs: OMIM: 605183; MGI: 1931464; GeneCards: CALML5
Available structures
PDB	Ortholog search: PDBe RCSB
PDB	List of PDB id codes 2B1U

Gene location (Human)
Chr.	Chromosome 10 (human)
Band	10p15.1	Start	5,498,697 bp
Band	10p15.1	End	5,499,570 bp

Gene location (Mouse)
Chr.	Chromosome 13 (mouse)
Band	13|13 A1	Start	3,887,757 bp
Band	13|13 A1	End	3,888,673 bp
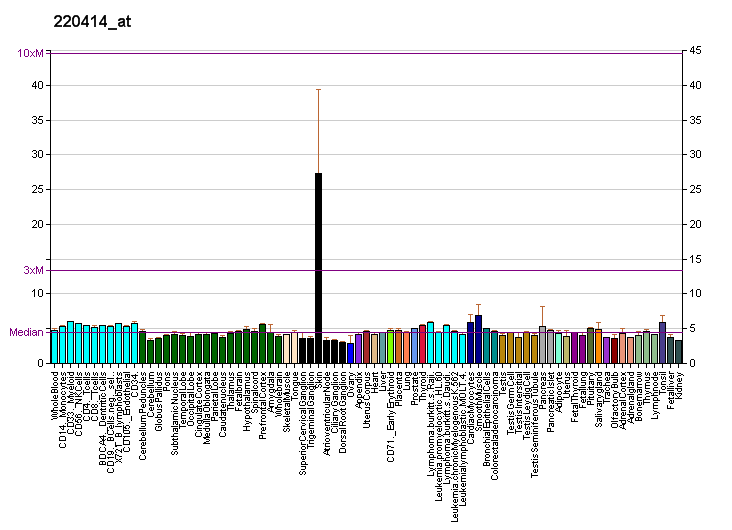
RNA expression pattern
Bgee	Human / Mouse (ortholog); Top expressed in: skin of abdomen; vulva; skin of leg; human penis; skin of thigh; skin of hip; skin of arm; nipple; minor salivary glands; parotid gland / Top expressed in: lip; skin of external ear; esophagus; umbilical cord; skin of abdomen; superior surface of tongue; skin of back; condyle; fossa; molar; More reference expression data
BioGPS	More reference expression data
Gene ontology
Molecular function	metal ion binding; calcium ion binding; enzyme regulator activity
Cellular component	extracellular region; ficolin-1-rich granule lumen; nucleus
Biological process	signal transduction; epidermis development; neutrophil degranulation; calcium-mediated signaling; regulation of catalytic activity; spindle pole body organization
Sources:Amigo / QuickGO
Orthologs
Databases	NCBI: entry; OMA: entry
Species	Human	Mouse
Entrez	51806	80796
Ensembl	ENSG00000178372	ENSMUSG00000033765
UniProt	Q9NZT1	Q9JM83
RefSeq (mRNA)	NM_017422	NM_020036
RefSeq (protein)	NP_059118	NP_064420
Location (UCSC)	Chr 10: 5.5 – 5.5 Mb	Chr 13: 3.89 – 3.89 Mb
PubMed search
- Wikidata
View/Edit Human	View/Edit Mouse

Calmodulin-like protein 5 is a protein that in humans is encoded by the CALML5 gene.

This gene encodes a novel calcium binding protein expressed in the epidermis and related to the calmodulin family of calcium binding proteins. Functional studies with recombinant protein demonstrate it does bind calcium and undergoes a conformational change when it does so. Abundant expression is detected only in reconstructed epidermis and is restricted to differentiating keratinocytes. In addition, it can associate with transglutaminase 3, shown to be a key enzyme in the terminal differentiation of keratinocytes.
