= Plasma membrane Ca2+ ATPase =

Transport protein

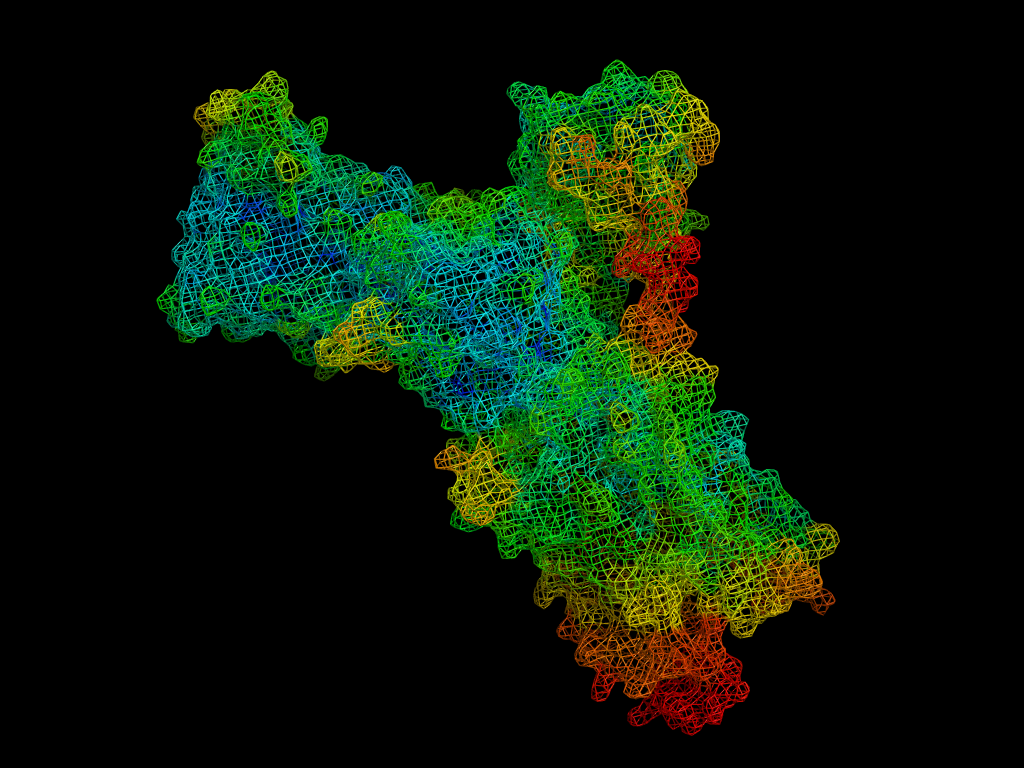
Rendered image of the Ca^{2+} pump

The plasma membrane Ca^{2+} ATPase (PMCA) is a transport protein in the plasma membrane of cells that functions as a calcium pump to remove calcium (Ca^{2+}) from the cell. PMCA function is vital for regulating the amount of Ca^{2+} within all eukaryotic cells. There is a very large transmembrane electrochemical gradient of Ca^{2+} driving the entry of the ion into cells, yet it is very important that they maintain low concentrations of Ca^{2+} for proper cell signalling. Thus, it is necessary for cells to employ ion pumps to remove the Ca^{2+}. The PMCA and the sodium calcium exchanger (NCX) are together the main regulators of intracellular Ca^{2+} concentrations. Since it transports Ca^{2+} into the extracellular space, the PMCA is also an important regulator of the calcium concentration in the extracellular space.

PMCAs belong to the family of P-type primary ion transport ATPases which form aspartyl phosphate intermediates.

Various forms of PMCA are expressed in different tissues, including the brain.

== Actions ==
The pump is powered by the hydrolysis of adenosine triphosphate (ATP), with a stoichiometry of one Ca^{2+} ion removed for each molecule of ATP hydrolysed. It binds tightly to Ca^{2+} ions (has a high affinity, with a K_{m} of 100 to 200 nM) but does not remove Ca^{2+} at a very fast rate. This is in contrast to the NCX, which has a low affinity and a high capacity. Thus, the PMCA is effective at binding Ca^{2+} even when its concentrations within the cell are very low, so it is suited for maintaining Ca^{2+} at its normally very low levels. Calcium is an important second messenger, so its levels must be kept low in cells to prevent noise and keep signalling accurate. The NCX is better suited for removing large amounts of Ca^{2+} quickly, as is needed in neurons after an action potential. Thus the activities of the two types of pump complement each other.

The PMCA functions in a similar manner to other p-type ion pumps. ATP transfers a phosphate to the PMCA, which forms a phosphorylated intermediate.

Ca^{2+}/calmodulin binds and further activates the PMCA, increasing the affinity of the protein's Ca^{2+}-binding site 20 to 30 times. Calmodulin also increases the rate at which the pump extrudes Ca^{2+} from the cell, possibly up to tenfold.

In brain tissue, it has been postulated that certain types of PMCA are important for regulating synaptic activity, since the PMCA is involved in regulating the amount of calcium within the cell at the synapse, and Ca^{2+} is involved in release of synaptic vesicles. Additionally, it has been shown that PMCA activity is modulated and partly powered by glycolysis in neuronal somata and dendrites. Presumably, it is due to PMCA proximity to glucose transporters in the plasma membrane.

== Structure ==
The structure of the PMCA is similar to that of the SERCA calcium pumps, which are responsible for removing calcium from the cytoplasm into the lumen of the sarcoplasmic reticulum. Calcium tends to have a slightly lower affinity for PMCA pumps than for SERCA pumps. It is thought that the PMCA pump has 10 segments that cross the plasma membrane, with both C and N termini on the inside of the cell. At the C terminus, there is a long "tail" of between 70 and 200 amino acids in length. This tail is thought to be responsible for regulation of the pump. PMCA pumps have a molecular mass of around 140 kDa.

== Isoforms ==
There are four isoforms of PMCA, called PMCA 1 through 4.

- ATP2B1 - PMCA1
- ATP2B2 - PMCA2
- ATP2B3 - PMCA3
- ATP2B4 - PMCA4

Each isoform is coded by a different gene and is expressed in different areas of the body. Alternate splicing of the mRNA transcripts of these genes results in different subtypes of these isoforms. Over 20 splice variants have been identified so far.

Three PMCA isoforms, PMCA1, PMCA2, and PMCA3, occur in the brain in varying distributions. PMCA1 is ubiquitous throughout all tissues in humans, and without it embryos do not survive. Lack of PMCA4, which is also very common in many tissues, is survivable, but leads to infertility in males. PMCA types 2 and 3 are activated more quickly and are, therefore, better suited to excitable cell types such as those in nervous and muscle tissue, which experiences large influxes of Ca^{2+} when excited. PMCA types 1, 2, and 4 have been found in glial cells called astrocytes in mammals, though it was previously thought that only the NCX was present in glia. Astrocytes help to maintain ionic balance in the extracellular space in the brain.

Knock-out of PMCA2 causes inner ear problems, including hearing loss and problems with balance.

PMCA4 exists in caveolae. Isoform PMCA4b interacts with nitric oxide synthase and reduces synthesis of nitric oxide by that enzyme.

PMCA isoform 4 has a molecular weight of 134,683, calculated from its sequence. This is in good agreement with the results of SDS gel electrophoresis.

== Pathology ==
When the PMCA fails to function properly, disease can result. Improperly functioning PMCA proteins have been found associated with conditions such as sensorineural deafness, diabetes, and hypertension.

In excitotoxicity, a process in which excessive amounts of the neurotransmitter glutamate overactivate neurons, resulting in excessive influx of Ca^{2+} into cells, the activity of the PMCA may be insufficient to remove the excess Ca^{2+}.

In breast tissue, mammary epithelial cells express PMCA2, which transports calcium across the apical surface of the cells into milk. PMCA2 expression falls on weaning, leading to calcium-induced apoptosis and mammary gland involution. Persistent PMCA2 expression in certain breast cancers lowers calcium levels inside malignant cells, allowing them to avoid apoptosis. These tumors are also usually positive for the HER2 protein, tend to involve the lymph nodes, and are more common among young women, which could help explain their worse prognosis compared with postmenopausal women.

Curcumin can bind to the PMCA, inducing a conformational change that prevents ATP from binding.

== History ==
PMCAs were first discovered in the 1960s in the membranes of red blood cells. The presence of an ATPase was discovered in the membranes in 1961, and then in 1966 it was discovered that these ATPases pump Ca^{2+} out of the cytosol.

PMCA was first purified from red blood cell membranes in 1979.
