= Ubiquitin—calmodulin ligase =

Class of enzymes

ubiquitin-calmodulin ligase

Identifiers
- EC no.: 6.3.2.21
- CAS no.: 119632-60-9

Databases
- IntEnz: IntEnz view
- BRENDA: BRENDA entry
- ExPASy: NiceZyme view
- KEGG: KEGG entry
- MetaCyc: metabolic pathway
- PRIAM: profile
- PDB structures: RCSB PDB PDBe PDBsum
- Gene Ontology: AmiGO / QuickGO
Search
- PMC: articles
- PubMed: articles
- NCBI: proteins

In enzymology, an ubiquitin-calmodulin ligase (EC 6.3.2.21) is an enzyme that catalyzes the chemical reaction

n ATP + calmodulin + n ubiquitin $\rightleftharpoons$ n AMP + n diphosphate + (ubiquitin)n-calmodulin

The 3 substrates of this enzyme are ATP, calmodulin, and ubiquitin, whereas its 3 products are AMP, diphosphate, and (ubiquitin)n-calmodulin.

This enzyme belongs to the family of ligases, specifically those forming carbon-nitrogen bonds as acid-D-amino-acid ligases (peptide synthases). The systematic name of this enzyme class is calmodulin:ubiquitin ligase (AMP-forming). Other names in common use include ubiquityl-calmodulin synthase, ubiquitin-calmodulin synthetase, ubiquityl-calmodulin synthetase, and uCaM-synthetase.
