= ATP2B1 =

Protein-coding gene in the species Homo sapiens

Identifiers
- Aliases: ATP2B1, ATPase, Ca++ transporting, plasma membrane 1, PMCA1, PMCA1kb, ATPase plasma membrane Ca2+ transporting 1
- External IDs: OMIM: 108731; MGI: 104653; GeneCards: ATP2B1
Enzyme activity
EC #	BRENDA	ExPASy	KEGG	MetaCyc
7.2.2.10	↗	↗	↗	↗

Gene location (Human)
Chr.	Chromosome 12 (human)
Band	12q21.33	Start	89,588,049 bp
Band	12q21.33	End	89,709,300 bp

Gene location (Mouse)
Chr.	Chromosome 10 (mouse)
Band	10|10 C3	Start	98,750,268 bp
Band	10|10 C3	End	98,862,005 bp
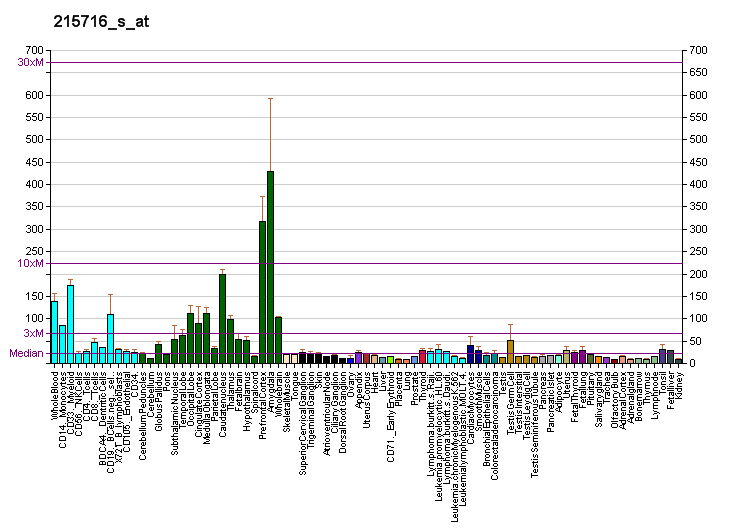

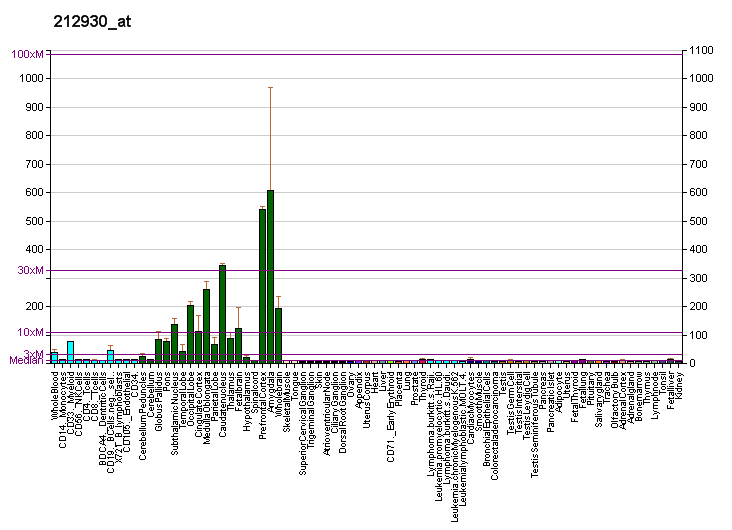

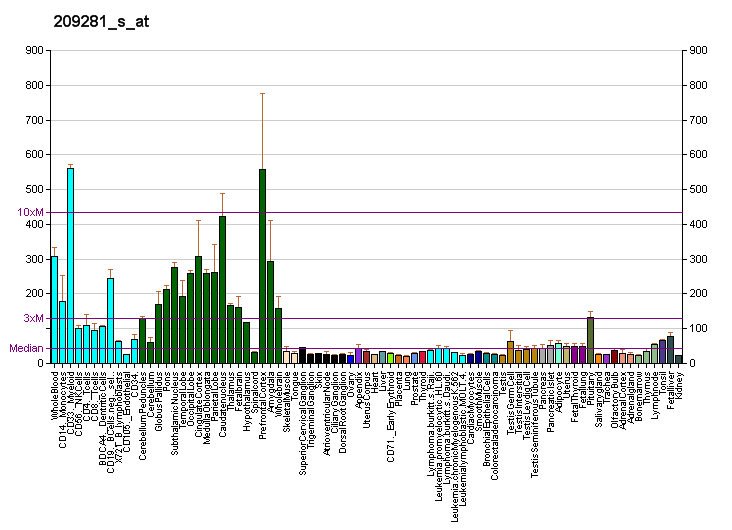
RNA expression pattern
Bgee	Human / Mouse (ortholog); Top expressed in: frontal pole; Brodmann area 23; lateral nuclear group of thalamus; occipital lobe; primary visual cortex; jejunal mucosa; external globus pallidus; secondary oocyte; cartilage tissue; superior frontal gyrus / Top expressed in: otolith organ; utricle; dorsal striatum; Region I of hippocampus proper; dentate gyrus of hippocampal formation granule cell; lateral geniculate nucleus; superior frontal gyrus; nucleus accumbens; medial geniculate nucleus; primary visual cortex; More reference expression data
BioGPS	More reference expression data
Gene ontology
Molecular function	nucleotide binding; PDZ domain binding; metal ion binding; calmodulin binding; protein binding; hydrolase activity; ATP binding; P-type calcium transporter activity; calcium ion transmembrane transporter activity; P-type calcium transporter activity involved in regulation of presynaptic cytosolic calcium ion concentration; ATPase activity
Cellular component	integral component of membrane; membrane; intracellular membrane-bounded organelle; plasma membrane; apical part of cell; integral component of plasma membrane; dendrite membrane; neuronal cell body membrane; basolateral plasma membrane; apical plasma membrane; dendritic spine membrane; membrane raft; cytoplasmic side of plasma membrane; extracellular exosome; nucleus; glutamatergic synapse; GABA-ergic synapse; integral component of presynaptic active zone membrane; immunological synapse; cell junction; synapse
Biological process	regulation of cardiac conduction; ageing; cellular calcium ion homeostasis; cellular response to vitamin D; ion transport; ion transmembrane transport; brain development; calcium ion transmembrane transport; cellular response to corticosterone stimulus; transport; response to cold; calcium ion export; neural retina development; calcium ion transport; regulation of cytosolic calcium ion concentration; regulation of presynaptic cytosolic calcium ion concentration; calcium ion export across plasma membrane; negative regulation of cytokine production; regulation of vascular associated smooth muscle contraction; regulation of blood pressure; positive regulation of bone mineralization; negative regulation of cytosolic calcium ion concentration; positive regulation of calcium ion transport; regulation of cellular response to insulin stimulus
Sources:Amigo / QuickGO
Orthologs
Databases	NCBI: entry; OMA: entry
Species	Human	Mouse
Entrez	490	67972
Ensembl	ENSG00000070961	ENSMUSG00000019943
UniProt	P20020	G5E829
RefSeq (mRNA)	NM_001001323; NM_001682	NM_026482; NM_001359506; NM_001359507; NM_001359508; NM_001359509
RefSeq (protein)	NP_001001323; NP_001673; NP_001353449; NP_001353450; NP_001353451 NP_001353452; NP_001353453; NP_001353454; NP_001353455; NP_001353456; NP_001353457; NP_001353458; NP_001353459; NP_001353460; NP_001353461	NP_080758; NP_001346435; NP_001346436; NP_001346437; NP_001346438
Location (UCSC)	Chr 12: 89.59 – 89.71 Mb	Chr 10: 98.75 – 98.86 Mb
PubMed search
- Wikidata
View/Edit Human	View/Edit Mouse

Plasma membrane calcium-transporting ATPase 1 also known as Plasma membrane calcium pump isoform 1 is a plasma membrane Ca^{2+} ATPase, an enzyme that in humans is encoded by the ATP2B1 gene. It's a transport protein, a translocase, a calcium pump EC 7.2.2.10.

The protein encoded by this gene belongs to the family of P-type primary ion transport ATPases characterized by the formation of an aspartyl phosphate intermediate during the reaction cycle. These enzymes remove bivalent calcium ions from eukaryotic cells against very large concentration gradients and play a critical role in intracellular calcium homeostasis. The mammalian plasma membrane calcium ATPase isoforms are encoded by at least four separate genes and the diversity of these enzymes is further increased by alternative splicing of transcripts. The expression of different isoforms and splice variants is regulated in a developmental, tissue- and cell type-specific manner, suggesting that these pumps are functionally adapted to the physiological needs of particular cells and tissues.

== Clinical significance ==
ATP2B1 is a critical host factor supporting cytotoxicity caused by Chironex fleckeri (a type of box jellyfish) stings. Blocking ATP2B1 is believed to have therapeutic potential for treating pain and skin necrosis caused by these stings.

Mutations of the ATP2B1 gene cause a neurodevelopmental delay with mild to moderately impaired intellectual development and mild speech delay.
