= Calexcitin =

Calcium-binding protein

Calexcitin is a calcium-binding protein first isolated from the sea snail Hermissenda crassicornis. It is upregulated following Pavlovian conditioning.

Calexcitin has four EF-hand motifs that possess different functions while the fourth one is nonfunctional. Calexcitin has the tendency to regulate K^{+} channels. In addition, Calexcitin also shows a sign of GTP binding protein in which that binds to Ca^{2+}.

Calexcitin is neuronal-specific and becomes phosphorylated and upregulated in learning of association.

== EF-hand motifs ==
Calexcitin which has four EF-hand motifs. The first three function in the binding metal ions which are from EF-1 to EF-3. EF-1 and EF-2 contain the proclivity into binding with Mg^{2+} and Ca^{2+}. However, the EF-3 has a tendency into binding with Ca^{2+}. The fourth EF-hand does not function due to the lack of metal-binding residues.

== Functions ==
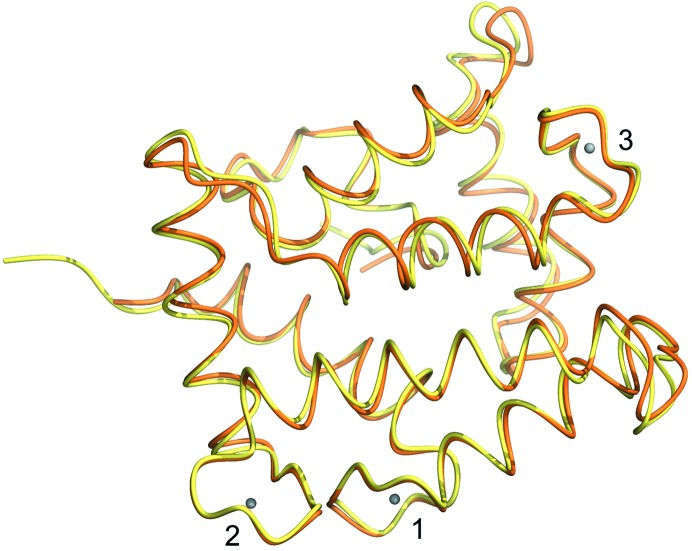
Difference electron density for the three metal-binding sites of calexcitin crystallized with equimolar Gd^{3+} in the presence of trace Ca^{2+}

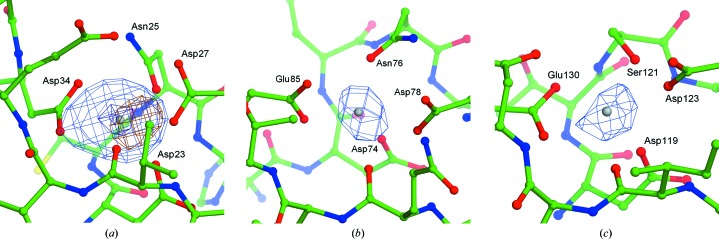
Superposition of the structure of the calexcitin-Gd^{3+}

Calexcitin directly regulate the K^{+} channels. Due to the fact that "Calexcitin is also a high affinity substrate for protein kinase C. Application of calexcitin to the inner surface of inside-out patches of human fibroblast membranes, in the presence of Ca^{2+} and the absence of endogenous Ca^{2+}/calmodulin kinase type II or protein kinase C activity, reduced the mean open time and mean open probability of 115 ± 6 pS K^{+} channels". Also, calexcitin is very great at making the membrane to be more excitable due to "When microinjected into molluscan neurons or rabbit cerebellar Purkinje cell dendrites". In addition, calexcitin acts as a Ca^{2+} activated signaling molecule in which it plays a role into increasing the cellular excitability. while making it more likely to increase the Ca^{2+} influx in the membrane. Also, this shows an example of GTP-binding protein that by which binds to Ca^{2+}.

=== References ===
- Nelson, Thomas J.; Cavallaro, Sebastiano; Yi, Chu-Li; McPhie, Donna; Schreurs, Bernard G.; Gusev, Pavel A.; Favit, Antonella; Zohar, Ofer; Kim, Jeongho; Beushausen, Sven; Ascoli, Giorgio; Olds, James; Neve, Rachael; Alkon, Daniel L. (1996). "Calexcitin: A signaling protein that binds calcium and GTP, inhibits potassium channels, and enhances membrane excitability". Proceedings of the National Academy of Sciences. 93 (24): 13808–13813. Bibcode:1996PNAS...9313808N. doi:10.1073/pnas.93.24.13808. PMC 19433. PMID 8943017.
- Nelson, T. J.; Cavallaro, S.; Yi, C. L.; McPhie, D.; Schreurs, B. G.; Gusev, P. A.; Favit, A.; Zohar, O.; Kim, J.; Beushausen, S.; Ascoli, G.; Olds, J.; Neve, R.; Alkon, D. L. (1996). "Calexcitin: A signaling protein that binds calcium and GTP, inhibits potassium channels, and enhances membrane excitability". Proceedings of the National Academy of Sciences of the United States of America. 93 (24): 13808–13813. Bibcode:1996PNAS...9313808N. doi:10.1073/pnas.93.24.13808. PMC 19433. PMID 8943017.
