= S100G =

Protein-coding gene in the species Homo sapiens

Identifiers
- Aliases: S100G, CABP, CABP1, CABP9K, CALB3, S100 calcium binding protein G
- External IDs: OMIM: 302020; MGI: 104528; GeneCards: S100G

Gene location (Human)
Chr.	X chromosome (human)
Band	Xp22.2	Start	16,650,158 bp
Band	Xp22.2	End	16,654,670 bp

Gene location (Mouse)
Chr.	X chromosome (mouse)
Band	X|X F4	Start	161,744,988 bp
Band	X|X F4	End	161,747,595 bp
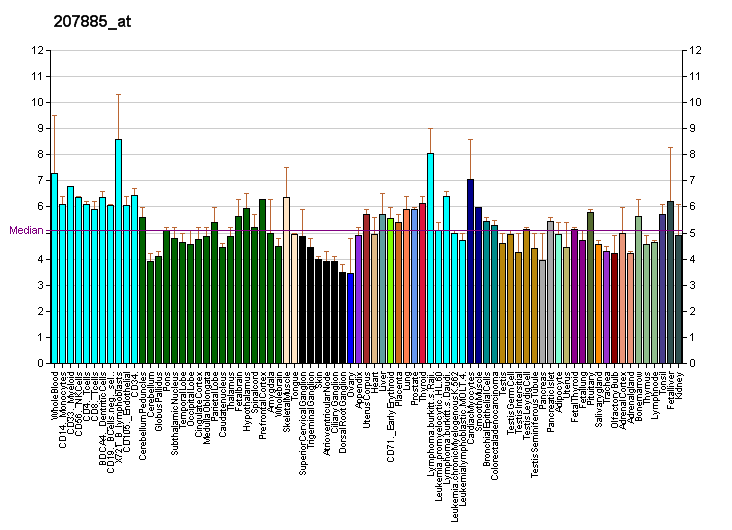
RNA expression pattern
Bgee	Human / Mouse (ortholog); Top expressed in: jejunal mucosa; duodenum; Achilles tendon; epithelium of colon; corpus callosum; face; right uterine tube; endometrium; sensory nervous system; sensory organ / Top expressed in: duodenum; yolk sac; right kidney; connecting tubule; human kidney; distal tubule; right lung lobe; uterus; left lung; distal convoluted tubule; More reference expression data
BioGPS	More reference expression data
Orthologs
Databases	NCBI: entry; OMA: entry
Species	Human	Mouse
Entrez	795	12309
Ensembl	ENSG00000169906	ENSMUSG00000040808
UniProt	P29377	P97816
RefSeq (mRNA)	NM_004057	NM_009789
RefSeq (protein)	NP_004048	NP_033919
Location (UCSC)	Chr X: 16.65 – 16.65 Mb	Chr X: 161.74 – 161.75 Mb
PubMed search
- Wikidata
View/Edit Human	View/Edit Mouse

S100 calcium-binding protein G (S100G) is a protein that in humans is encoded by the S100G gene.

This gene encodes calbindin D9K, a vitamin D-dependent calcium-binding protein. This cytosolic protein belongs to a family of calcium-binding proteins that includes calmodulin, parvalbumin, troponin C, and S100 protein. In the intestine, the protein is vitamin D-dependent and its expression correlates with calcium transport activity. The protein may increase Ca^{2+} absorption by buffering Ca^{2+} in the cytoplasm and increase ATP-dependent Ca^{2+} transport in duodenal basolateral membrane vesicles.
