= Calretinin =

Protein found in humans

CALB2

Identifiers
- Aliases: CALB2, CAB29, CAL2, CR, calbindin 2
- External IDs: OMIM: 114051; MGI: 101914; GeneCards: CALB2

Gene location (Human)
Chr.	Chromosome 16 (human)
Band	16q22.2	Start	71,358,713 bp
Band	16q22.2	End	71,390,436 bp

Gene location (Mouse)
Chr.	Chromosome 8 (mouse)
Band	8|8 D3	Start	110,864,134 bp
Band	8|8 D3	End	110,894,842 bp
RNA expression pattern
Bgee	Human / Mouse (ortholog); Top expressed in: hypothalamus; right hemisphere of cerebellum; subcutaneous adipose tissue; right adrenal gland; right adrenal cortex; left adrenal cortex; temporal lobe; amygdala; anterior cingulate cortex; substantia nigra / Top expressed in: habenula; vestibular membrane of cochlear duct; neural layer of retina; dentate gyrus of hippocampal formation granule cell; olfactory bulb; cerebellar cortex; ventral tegmental area; lobe of cerebellum; central gray substance of midbrain; ventromedial nucleus; More reference expression data
BioGPS	n/a
Gene ontology
Molecular function	calcium ion binding; metal ion binding; calcium ion binding involved in regulation of presynaptic cytosolic calcium ion concentration
Cellular component	neuron projection; gap junction; synapse; nucleus; cytoplasm; cytosol; synaptic membrane; parallel fiber to Purkinje cell synapse; presynapse; dendrite; stereocilium; cuticular plate
Biological process	regulation of cytosolic calcium ion concentration; regulation of presynaptic cytosolic calcium ion concentration; regulation of long-term synaptic potentiation
Sources:Amigo / QuickGO
Orthologs
Databases	NCBI: entry; OMA: entry
Species	Human	Mouse
Entrez	794	12308
Ensembl	ENSG00000172137; ENSG00000282830	ENSMUSG00000003657
UniProt	P22676	Q08331
RefSeq (mRNA)	NM_001740; NM_007087; NM_007088	NM_007586; NM_001368293; NM_001368294
RefSeq (protein)	NP_001731; NP_009019	NP_031612; NP_001355222; NP_001355223
Location (UCSC)	Chr 16: 71.36 – 71.39 Mb	Chr 8: 110.86 – 110.89 Mb
PubMed search
- Wikidata
View/Edit Human	View/Edit Mouse

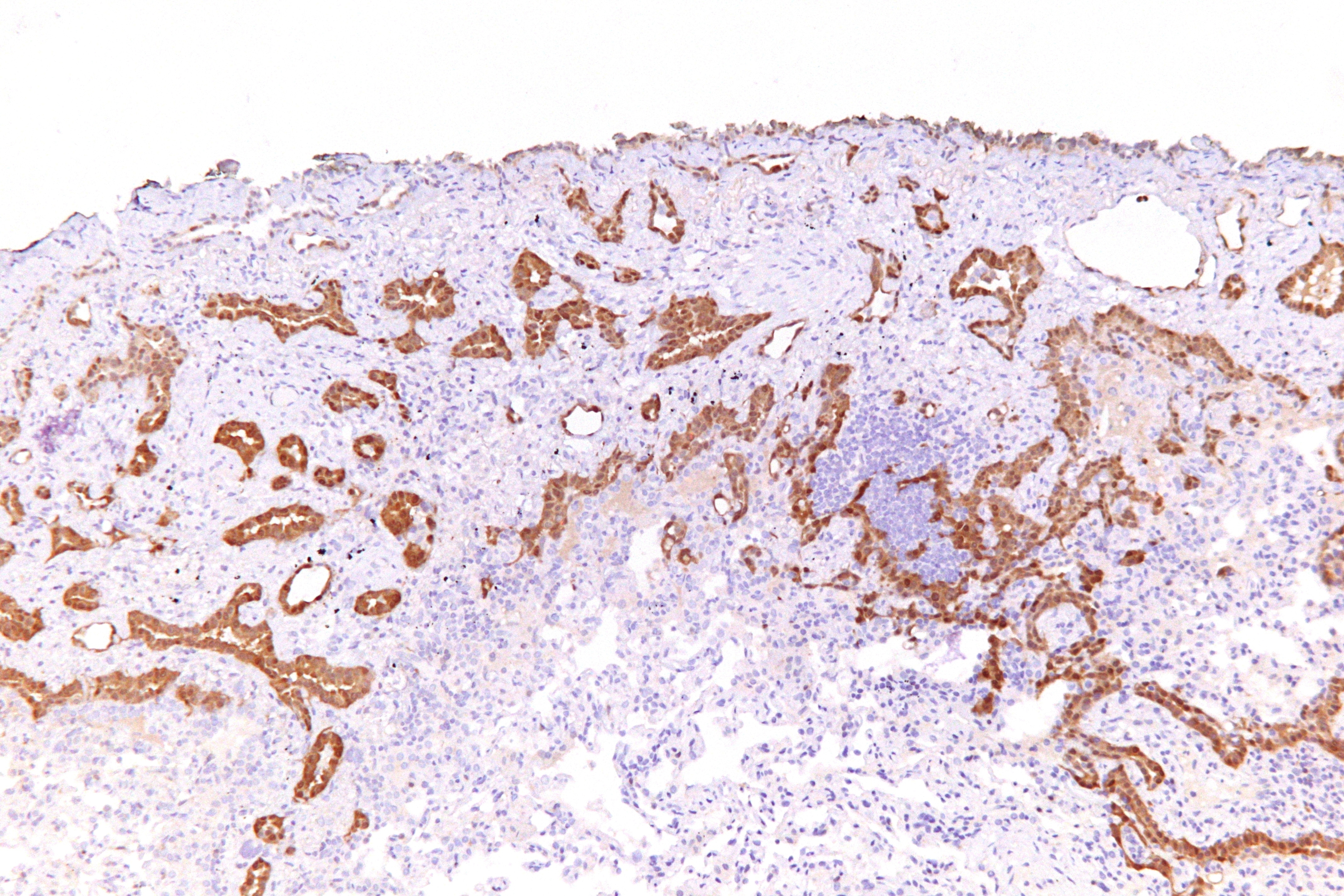
Micrograph of a malignant epithelioid mesothelioma stained with an antibody against calretinin

Calretinin, also known as calbindin 2 (formerly 29 kDa calbindin), is a calcium-binding protein involved in calcium signaling. In humans, the calretinin protein is encoded by the CALB2 gene.

== Function ==
This gene encodes an intracellular calcium-binding protein belonging to the troponin C superfamily. Members of this protein family have six EF-hand domains which bind calcium. This protein plays a role in diverse cellular functions, including message targeting and intracellular calcium buffering.

Calretinin is abundantly expressed in neurons including retina (which gave it the name) and cortical interneurons. Expression was found in different neurons than that of the similar vitamin D-dependent calcium-binding protein, calbindin-28kDa.

Calretinin has an important role as a modulator of neuronal excitability including the induction of long-term potentiation. Loss of expression of calretinin in hippocampal interneurons has been suggested to be relevant in temporal lobe epilepsy.

It is expressed in a number of other locations including hair follicles.

== Clinical significance ==
Calretinin is a diagnostic marker for some human diseases, including Hirschsprung disease and some cancers.

=== Mesothelioma ===
Using immunohistochemistry, calretinin can be demonstrated in both benign mesothelium and in malignant mesothelioma and can be used to help differentiate different lung tumours. Antibodies to calretinin can also be used to distinguish between different types of brain tumour, demonstrating only those with neuronal rather than glial, differentiation. Furthermore, the essential function of calretinin in mesothelioma cell lines has been demonstrated in vitro and may be an interesting target for therapeutical approaches.

=== Hirschsprung disease ===
In Hirschsprung disease, calretinin immunohistochemistry offers additional diagnostic value in specimens with inadequate amount of submucosa and rarely seen ganglion cells. The presence of ganglion cells consistently correlated with calretinin-positive thin nerve fibrils in the lamina propria, muscularis mucosae and superficial submucosa. These calretinin-positive thin neurofibrils are absent in the aganglionic segments of bowel and in the areas without ganglion cells from the junction of normal with diseased rectum. Calretinin is strongly expressed in the submucosal and subserosal nerve trunks in the ganglionic segment. No calretinin expression is seen in the nerve trunks in the rest of the aganglionic segment. It has faint expression in the thick nerve trunks from the areas without ganglion cells. Faint positivity of the thick submucosal and subserosal nerves in the absence of ganglion cells and calretinin positive nerve fibrils, is characteristic of the junction of the aganglionic-to-normal rectum.

=== Desinhibition of pyramid cells ===
CR+ interneurons participate in the disinhibition of other cortical GABAergic interneurons. The targets of CR+ cells are mainly Martinotti cells; in turn, the axonal arbors of Martinotti cells form inhibitory contacts with the distal tuft dendrites of pyramidal neurons. Thus, activation of CR+ interneurons leads to disinhibition of the apical dendrites of pyramidal cells, acting as a “gate-opening” mechanism for neural information.
