= ATP2B3 =

Protein-coding gene in humans

Identifiers
- Aliases: ATP2B3, CFAP39, CLA2, OPCA, PMCA3, PMCA3a, SCAX1, ATPase plasma membrane Ca2+ transporting 3
- External IDs: OMIM: 300014; MGI: 1347353; GeneCards: ATP2B3
Enzyme activity
EC #	BRENDA	ExPASy	KEGG	MetaCyc
7.2.2.10	↗	↗	↗	↗

Gene location (Human)
Chr.	X chromosome (human)
Band	Xq28	Start	153,517,642 bp
Band	Xq28	End	153,582,939 bp

Gene location (Mouse)
Chr.	X chromosome (mouse)
Band	X|X A7.3	Start	72,546,692 bp
Band	X|X A7.3	End	72,614,611 bp
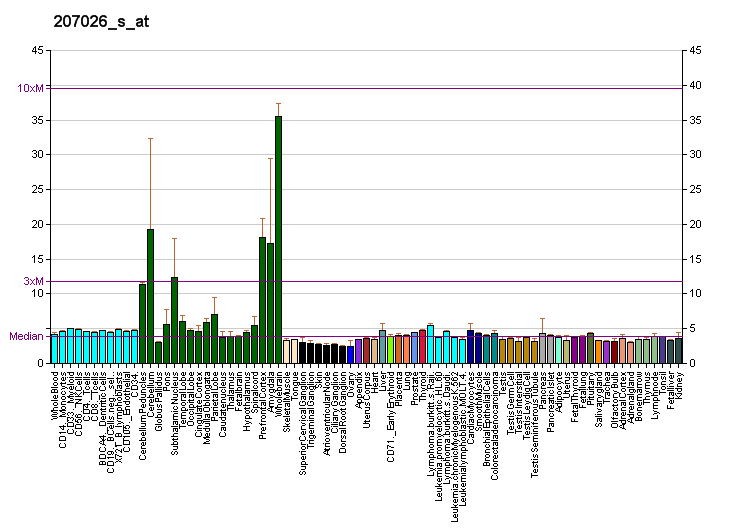

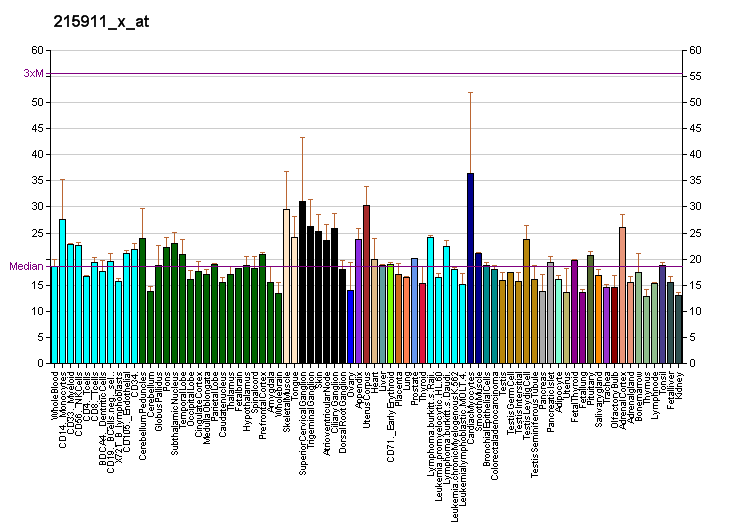
RNA expression pattern
Bgee	Human / Mouse (ortholog); Top expressed in: endothelial cell; Brodmann area 23; middle temporal gyrus; primary visual cortex; right hemisphere of cerebellum; frontal pole; superior frontal gyrus; cerebellar vermis; postcentral gyrus; paraflocculus of cerebellum / Top expressed in: cerebellar cortex; dentate gyrus of hippocampal formation granule cell; hippocampus proper; primary visual cortex; superior frontal gyrus; hypothalamus; adrenal gland; basal forebrain; striatum of neuraxis; secondary oocyte; More reference expression data
BioGPS	More reference expression data
Gene ontology
Molecular function	metal ion binding; nucleotide binding; hydrolase activity; PDZ domain binding; calmodulin binding; ATP binding; P-type calcium transporter activity; protein binding; calcium ion transmembrane transporter activity; P-type calcium transporter activity involved in regulation of presynaptic cytosolic calcium ion concentration
Cellular component	extracellular vesicle; integral component of membrane; Golgi apparatus; intracellular membrane-bounded organelle; integral component of plasma membrane; membrane; plasma membrane; presynapse; glutamatergic synapse; GABA-ergic synapse
Biological process	calcium ion transport; regulation of cardiac conduction; cellular calcium ion homeostasis; ion transport; calcium ion transmembrane transport; ion transmembrane transport; transport; regulation of cytosolic calcium ion concentration; regulation of presynaptic cytosolic calcium ion concentration; calcium ion export across plasma membrane
Sources:Amigo / QuickGO
Orthologs
Databases	NCBI: entry; OMA: entry
Species	Human	Mouse
Entrez	492	320707
Ensembl	ENSG00000067842	ENSMUSG00000031376
UniProt	Q16720	n/a
RefSeq (mRNA)	NM_001001344; NM_021949; NM_001388360; NM_001388361; NM_001388362	NM_177236; NM_001310537
RefSeq (protein)	NP_001001344; NP_068768	n/a
Location (UCSC)	Chr X: 153.52 – 153.58 Mb	Chr X: 72.55 – 72.61 Mb
PubMed search
- Wikidata
View/Edit Human	View/Edit Mouse

Plasma membrane calcium-transporting ATPase 3 (PMCA3) is an enzyme that in humans is encoded by the ATP2B3 gene.

The protein encoded by this gene belongs to the family of P-type primary ion transport ATPases characterized by the formation of an aspartyl phosphate intermediate during the reaction cycle. These enzymes remove bivalent calcium ions from eukaryotic cells against very large concentration gradients and play a critical role in intracellular calcium homeostasis. The mammalian plasma membrane calcium ATPase isoforms are encoded by at least four separate genes and the diversity of these enzymes is further increased by alternative splicing of transcripts. The expression of different isoforms and splice variants is regulated in a developmental, tissue- and cell type-specific manner, suggesting that these pumps are functionally adapted to the physiological needs of particular cells and tissues. This gene encodes the plasma membrane calcium ATPase isoform 3. Alternatively spliced transcript variants encoding different isoforms have been identified.
