= Calcium pump =

Family of transport proteins

Calcium pumps are a family of ion transporters found in the cell membrane of all animal cells. They are responsible for the active transport of calcium out of the cell for the maintenance of the steep Ca^{2+} electrochemical gradient across the cell membrane. Calcium pumps play a crucial role in proper cell signalling by keeping the intracellular calcium concentration roughly 10,000 times lower than the extracellular concentration. Essentially, calcium pumps use energy to transport calcium across cell membranes, which allows the body to perform tasks that would otherwise be difficult to perform. Failure for the body to transport sufficient amounts of calcium is one cause of muscle cramps.

The plasma membrane Ca^{2+} ATPase and the sodium-calcium exchanger are together the main regulators of cytoplasmic Ca^{2+} concentrations.

== Biological role ==
Ca^{2+} has many important roles as an intracellular messenger. The release of a large amount of free Ca^{2+} can trigger a fertilized egg to develop, skeletal muscle cells to contract, secretion by secretory cells and interactions with Ca^{2+} -responsive proteins like calmodulin. To maintain low concentrations of free Ca^{2+} in the cytosol, cells use membrane pumps like calcium ATPase found in the membranes of sarcoplasmic reticulum of skeletal muscle. These pumps are needed to provide the steep electrochemical gradient that allows Ca^{2+} to rush into the cytosol when a stimulus signal opens the Ca^{2+} channels in the membrane. The pumps are also necessary to actively pump the Ca^{2+} back out of the cytoplasm and return the cell to its pre-signal state.

== Crystallography of calcium pumps ==
The structure of calcium pumps found in the sarcoplasmic reticulum of skeletal muscle was elucidated in 2000 by Toyoshima, et al. using microscopy of tubular crystals and 3D microcrystals. The pump has a molecular mass of 110,000 amu, shows three well separated cytoplasmic domains, with a transmembrane domain consisting of ten alpha helices and two transmembrane Ca^{2+} binding sites.

== Mechanism ==
Classical theory of active transport for P-type ATPases

E1 →	(2H^{+} out, 2Ca^{2+} in)→	E1⋅2Ca^{2+} →	E1⋅ ATP
↑			↓
E2			E1⋅ADP
↑(Pi out)			↓(ADP out)
E2⋅Pi	← E2P	←(2H^{+} in, 2Ca^{2+} out)	← E1P

Data from crystallography studies by Chikashi Toyoshima applied to the above cycle

E1 - high affinity for Ca^{2+}, 2 Ca^{2+} bound, 2 H^{+} counter ions released
E1⋅2Ca^{2+} - cytoplasmic gate open, free Ca^{2+} ion exchange occurs between bound ions and those in cytoplasm, closed configuration of N, P, A domains broken, exposing catalytic site
E1⋅ ATP - ATP binds and links N to P, P bends, N contacts A, A causes M1 helix to pull up, closes cytoplasmic gate, bound Ca^{2+} occluded in transmembrane
E1⋅ADP - Phosphoryl transfer, ADP dissociates
E1P - A rotates, transmembrane helices rearrange, binding sites destroyed, lumenal gate opened, bound Ca^{2+} released
E2P - open ion pathway to lumen, Ca^{2+} to lumen
E2⋅Pi - A catalyzes release of the Pi, P unbends, transmembrane helices rearranged, closes lumenal gate
E2 - transmembrane M1 forms cytoplasmic access tunnel to Ca^{2+} binding sites
