= Calcium-binding protein =

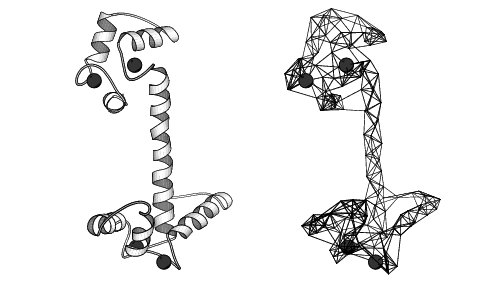
Calmodulin protein

Calcium-binding proteins are proteins that participate in calcium cell signaling pathways by binding to Ca^{2+}, the calcium ion that plays an important role in many cellular processes. Calcium-binding proteins have specific domains that bind to calcium and are known to be heterogeneous.

One of the functions of calcium binding proteins is to regulate the amount of free (unbound) Ca^{2+} in the cytosol of the cell. The cellular regulation of calcium is known as calcium homeostasis.

== Types ==
Many different calcium-binding proteins exist, with different cellular and tissue distribution and involvement in specific functions. Calcium binding proteins also serve an important physiological role for cells. The most ubiquitous Ca^{2+}-sensing protein, found in all eukaryotic organisms including yeasts, is calmodulin. Intracellular storage and release of Ca^{2+} from the sarcoplasmic reticulum is associated with the high-capacity, low-affinity calcium-binding protein calsequestrin. Calretinin is another type of Calcium binding protein weighing 29kD. It is involved in cell signaling and shown to exist in neurons. This type of protein is also found in large quantities in malignant mesothelial cells, which can be easily differentiated from carcinomas. This differentiation is later applied for a diagnosis on ovarian stromal tumors. Also, another member of the EF-hand superfamily is the S100B protein, which regulates p53. P53 is known as a tumor suppressor protein and in this case acts as a transcriptional activator or repressor of numerous genes. S100B proteins are abundantly found in cancerous tumor cells causing them to be overexpressed, therefore making these proteins useful for classifying tumors. In addition, this explains why this protein can easily interact with p53 when transcriptional regulation takes place.

Calcium-binding proteins can be either intracellular and extracellular. Those that are intracellular can contain or lack a structural EF-hand domain. Extracellular calcium-binding proteins are classified into six groups. Since Ca (2+) is an important second messenger, it can act as an activator or inhibitor in gene transcription. Those that belong to the EF-hand superfamily such as Calmodulin and Calcineurin have been linked to transcription regulation. When levels of Ca(2+) increase in the cell, these members of the EF-hand superfamily regulate transcription indirectly by phosphorylating/dephosphorylating transcription factors.

=== Secretory calcium-binding phosphoprotein ===
The secretory calcium-binding phosphoprotein (SCPP) gene family consists of an ancient group of genes emerging around the same time as bony fish. SCPP genes are roughly divided into acidic and P/Q-rich types: the former mostly participates in bone and dentin formation, while the latter usually participate in enamel/enameloid formation. In mammals, P/Q-rich SCPP is also found in saliva and milk and includes unorthodox members such as MUC7 (a mucin) and casein. SCPP genes are recognized by exon structure rather than protein sequence.

== Functions ==
With their role in signal transduction, calcium-binding proteins contribute to all aspects of the cell's functioning, from homeostasis to learning and memory. For example, the neuron-specific calexcitin has been found to have an excitatory effect on neurons, and interacts with proteins that control the firing state of neurons, such as the voltage-dependent potassium channel.

Compartmentalization of calcium binding proteins such as calretinin and calbindin-28 kDa has been noted within cells, suggesting that these proteins perform distinct functions in localized calcium signaling. It also indicates that in addition to freely diffusing through the cytoplasm to attain a homogeneous distribution, calcium binding proteins can bind to cellular structures through interactions that are likely important for their functions.

== See also ==
- Calbindin
- Calmodulin
- Calsequestrin
- Troponin
