= Calmodulin =

Messenger protein

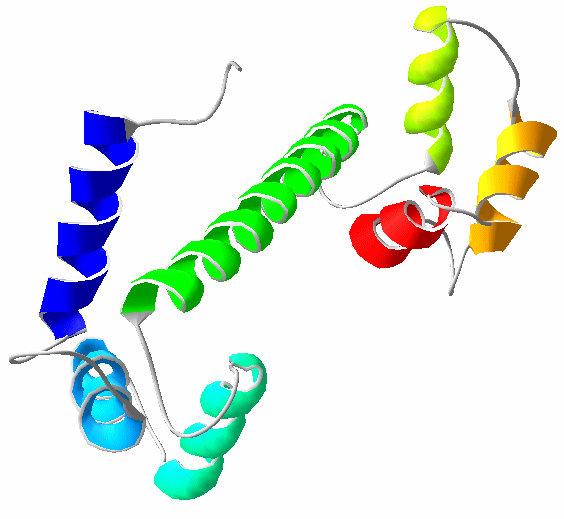
- 3D structure of Ca^{2+}-bound calmodulin (PDB: 1OSA)

Identifiers
- Symbol: CaM
- PDB: 1OSA
- UniProt: P62158
Search for
- Structures: Swiss-model
- Domains: InterPro

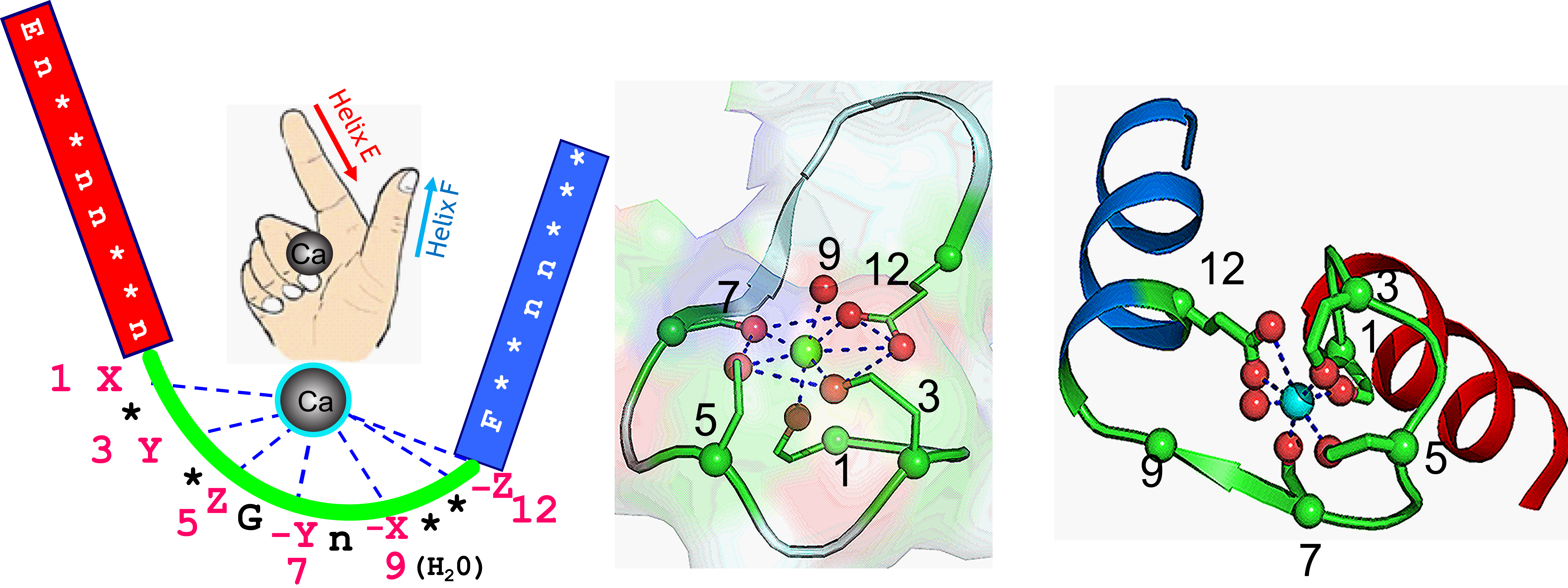
The helix–loop–helix structure of the calcium-binding EF hand motif

Calmodulin (CaM) (an abbreviation for calcium-modulated protein) is a multifunctional intermediate calcium-binding messenger protein expressed in all eukaryotic cells. It is an intracellular target of the secondary messenger Ca^{2+}, and the binding of Ca^{2+} is required for the activation of calmodulin. Once bound to Ca^{2+}, calmodulin acts as part of a calcium signal transduction pathway by modifying its interactions with various target proteins such as kinases or phosphatases.

== Structure ==
Calmodulin is a small, highly conserved protein that is 148 amino acids long (16.7 kDa). The protein has two approximately symmetrical globular domains (the N- and C- domains) each containing a pair of EF hand motifs separated by a flexible linker region for a total of four Ca^{2+} binding sites, two in each globular domain. In the Ca^{2+}-free state, the helices that form the four EF-hands are collapsed in a compact orientation, and the central linker is disordered; in the Ca^{2+}-saturated state, the EF-hand helices adopt an open orientation roughly perpendicular to one another, and the central linker forms an extended alpha-helix in the crystal structure, but remains largely disordered in solution. The C-domain has a higher binding affinity for Ca^{2+} than the N-domain.

Calmodulin is structurally quite similar to troponin C, another Ca^{2+}-binding protein containing four EF-hand motifs. However, troponin C contains an additional alpha-helix at its N-terminus, and is constitutively bound to its target, troponin I. It therefore does not exhibit the same diversity of target recognition as does calmodulin.

=== Importance of flexibility in calmodulin ===
Calmodulin's ability to recognize a tremendous range of target proteins is due in large part to its structural flexibility. In addition to the flexibility of the central linker domain, the N- and C-domains undergo open-closed conformational cycling in the Ca^{2+}-bound state. Calmodulin also exhibits great structural variability, and undergoes considerable conformational fluctuations, when bound to targets. Moreover, the predominantly hydrophobic nature of binding between calmodulin and most of its targets allows for recognition of a broad range of target protein sequences. Together, these features allow calmodulin to recognize some 300 target proteins exhibiting a variety of CaM-binding sequence motifs.

== Mechanism ==
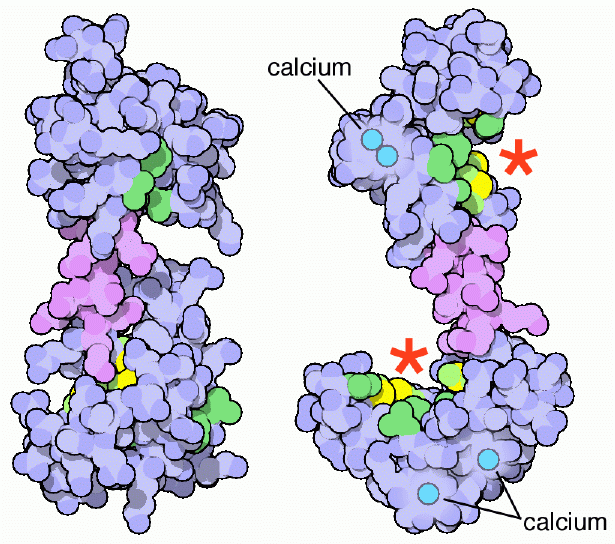
This images shows conformational changes in calmodulin. On the left is calmodulin without calcium and on the right is calmodulin with calcium. Sites that bind target proteins are indicated by red stars.

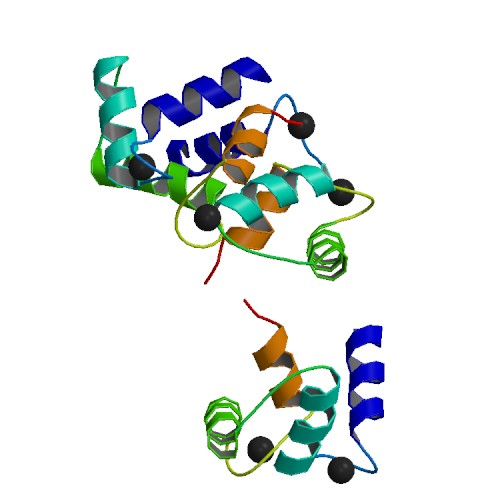
Solution structure of Ca^{2+}-calmodulin C-terminal domain

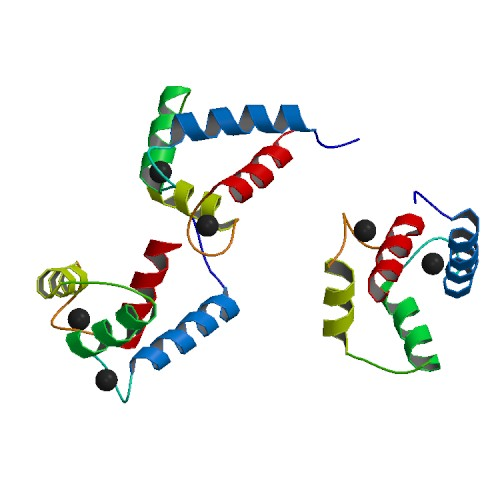
Solution structure of Ca^{2+}-calmodulin N-terminal domain

Binding of Ca^{2+} by the EF-hands causes an opening of the N- and C-domains, which exposes hydrophobic target-binding surfaces. These surfaces interact with complementary nonpolar segments on target proteins, typically consisting of groups of bulky hydrophobic amino acids separated by 10–16 polar and/or basic amino acids. The flexible central domain of calmodulin allows the protein to wrap around its target, although alternate modes of binding are known. "Canonical" targets of calmodulin, such as myosin light-chain kinases and CaMKII, bind only to the Ca^{2+}-bound protein, whereas some proteins, such as NaV channels and IQ-motif proteins, also bind to calmodulin in the absence of Ca^{2+}. Binding of calmodulin induces conformational rearrangements in the target protein via "mutually induced fit", leading to changes in the target protein's function.

Calcium binding by calmodulin exhibits considerable cooperativity, making calmodulin an unusual example of a monomeric (single-chain) cooperative binding protein. Furthermore, target binding alters the binding affinity of calmodulin toward Ca^{2+} ions, which allows for complex allosteric interplay between Ca^{2+} and target binding interactions. This influence of target binding on Ca^{2+} affinity is believed to allow for Ca^{2+} activation of proteins that are constitutively bound to calmodulin, such as small-conductance Ca^{2+}-activated potassium (SK) channels.

Although calmodulin principally operates as a Ca^{2+} binding protein, it also coordinates other metal ions. For example, in the presence of typical intracellular concentrations of Mg^{2+} (0.5–1.0 mM) and resting concentrations of Ca^{2+} (100 nM), calmodulin's Ca^{2+} binding sites are at least partially saturated by Mg^{2+}. This Mg^{2+} is displaced by the higher concentrations of Ca^{2+} generated by signaling events. Similarly, Ca^{2+} may itself be displaced by other metal ions, such as the trivalent lanthanides, that associate with calmodulin's binding pockets even more strongly than Ca^{2+}. Though such ions distort calmodulin's structure and are generally not physiologically relevant due to their scarcity in vivo, they have nonetheless seen wide scientific use as reporters of calmodulin structure and function.

== Role in animals ==
Calmodulin mediates many crucial processes such as inflammation, metabolism, apoptosis, smooth muscle contraction, intracellular movement, short-term and long-term memory, and the immune response. Calcium participates in an intracellular signaling system by acting as a diffusible second messenger to the initial stimuli. It does this by binding various targets in the cell including a large number of enzymes, ion channels, aquaporins and other proteins. Calmodulin is expressed in many cell types and can have different subcellular locations, including the cytoplasm, within organelles, or associated with the plasma or organelle membranes, but it is always found intracellularly. Many of the proteins that calmodulin binds are unable to bind calcium themselves, and use calmodulin as a calcium sensor and signal transducer. Calmodulin can also make use of the calcium stores in the endoplasmic reticulum, and the sarcoplasmic reticulum. Calmodulin can undergo post-translational modifications, such as phosphorylation, acetylation, methylation and proteolytic cleavage, each of which has potential to modulate its actions.

=== Specific examples ===
==== Role in smooth muscle contraction ====
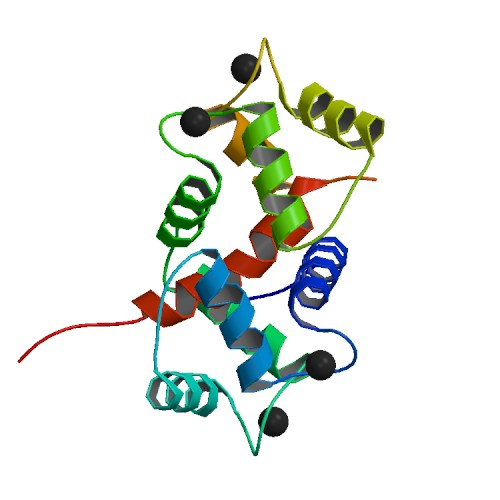
Calmodulin bound to a peptide from MLC kinase (PDB: 2LV6)

Calmodulin plays an important role in excitation contraction (EC) coupling and the initiation of the cross-bridge cycling in smooth muscle, ultimately causing smooth muscle contraction. In order to activate contraction of smooth muscle, the head of the myosin light chain must be phosphorylated. This phosphorylation is done by myosin light chain (MLC) kinase. This MLC kinase is activated by a calmodulin when it is bound by calcium, thus making smooth muscle contraction dependent on the presence of calcium, through the binding of calmodulin and activation of MLC kinase.

Another way that calmodulin affects muscle contraction is by controlling the movement of Ca^{2+} across both the cell and sarcoplasmic reticulum membranes. The Ca^{2+} channels, such as the ryanodine receptor of the sarcoplasmic reticulum, can be inhibited by calmodulin bound to calcium, thus affecting the overall levels of calcium in the cell. Calcium pumps take calcium out of the cytoplasm or store it in the endoplasmic reticulum and this control helps regulate many downstream processes.

This is a very important function of calmodulin because it indirectly plays a role in every physiological process that is affected by smooth muscle contraction such as digestion and contraction of arteries (which helps distribute blood and regulate blood pressure).

==== Role in metabolism ====
Calmodulin plays an important role in the activation of phosphorylase kinase, which ultimately leads to glucose being cleaved from glycogen by glycogen phosphorylase.

Calmodulin also plays an important role in lipid metabolism by affecting calcitonin. Calcitonin is a polypeptide hormone that lowers blood Ca^{2+} levels and activates Gs protein cascades that leads to the generation of cAMP. The actions of calcitonin can be blocked by inhibiting the actions of calmodulin, suggesting that calmodulin plays a crucial role in the activation of calcitonin.

==== Role in short-term and long-term memory ====
Ca^{2+}/calmodulin-dependent protein kinase II (CaMKII) plays a crucial role in a type of synaptic plasticity known as long-term potentiation (LTP) which requires the presence of calcium/calmodulin. CaMKII contributes to the phosphorylation of an AMPA receptor which increases the sensitivity of AMPA receptors. Furthermore, research shows that inhibiting CaMKII interferes with LTP.

== Role in plants ==
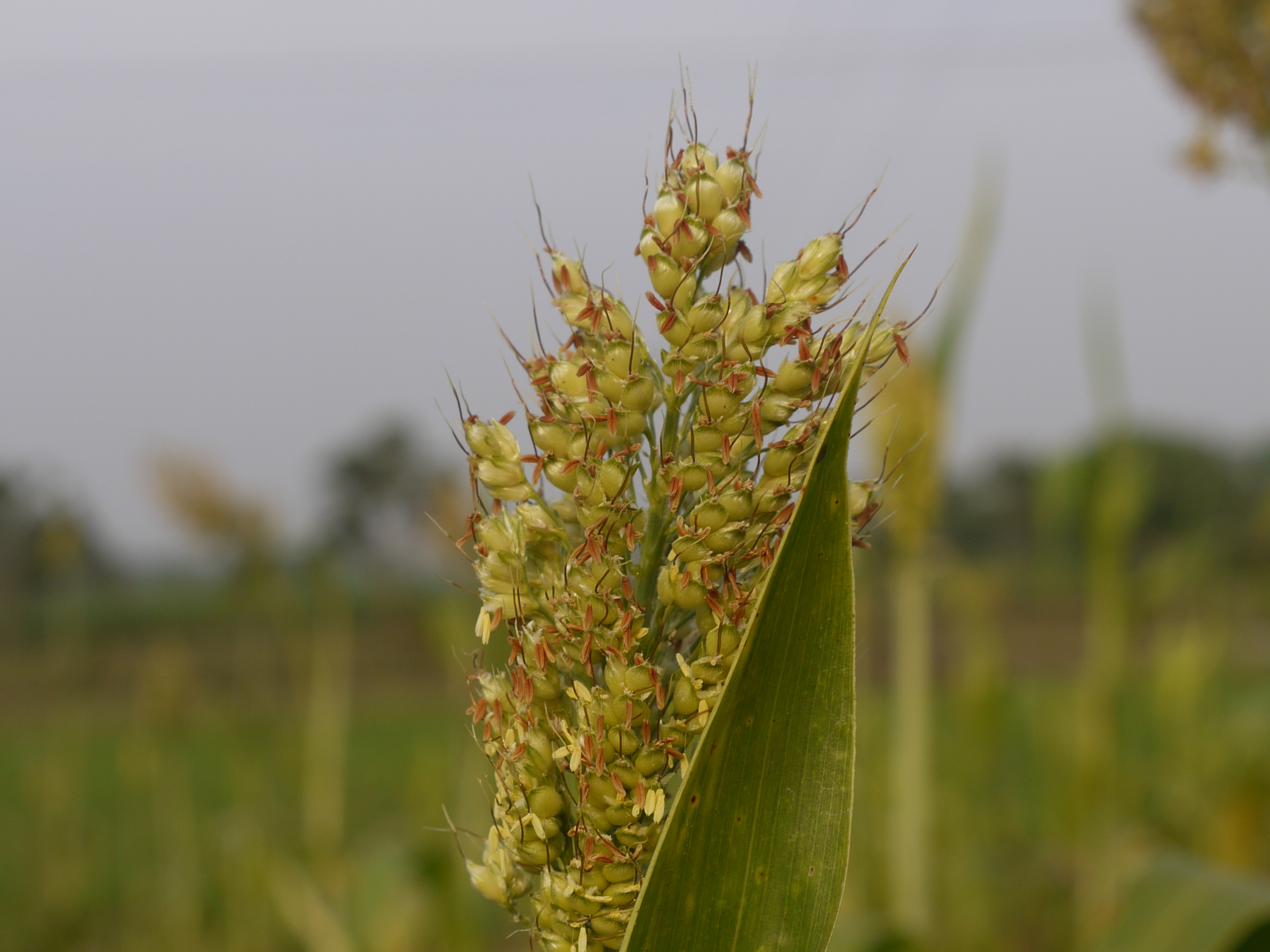
Sorghum plant contains temperature-responsive genes. These genes help the plant adapt in extreme weather conditions such as hot and dry environments.

While yeasts have only a single CaM gene, plants and vertebrates contain an evolutionarily conserved form of CaM genes. The difference between plants and animals in Ca^{2+} signaling is that the plants contain an extended family of the CaM in addition to the evolutionarily conserved form. Calmodulins play an essential role in plant development and adaptation to environmental stimuli.

Calcium plays a key role in the structural integrity of the cell wall and the membrane system of the cell. However, high calcium levels can be toxic to a plant's cellular energy metabolism and, hence, the Ca^{2+} concentration in the cytosol is maintained at a submicromolar level by removing the cytosolic Ca^{2+} to either the apoplast or the lumen of the intracellular organelles. Ca^{2+} pulses created due to increased influx and efflux act as cellular signals in response to external stimuli such as hormones, light, gravity, abiotic stress factors and also interactions with pathogens.

=== Cmls (CaM-related proteins) ===
Plants contain CaM-related proteins (CMLs) apart from the typical CaM proteins. The CMLs have about 15% amino acid similarity with the typical CaMs. Arabidopsis thaliana contains about 50 different CML genes, which leads to the question of what purpose these diverse ranges of proteins serve in the cellular function. All plant species exhibit this diversity in the CML genes. The different CaMs and CMLs differ in their affinity to bind and activate the CaM-regulated enzymes in vivo. The CaM or CMLs are also found to be located in different organelle compartments.

=== Plant growth and development ===
In Arabidopsis, the protein DWF1 plays an enzymatic role in the biosynthesis of brassinosteroids, steroid hormones in plants that are required for growth. An interaction occurs between CaM and DWF1, and DWF1 being unable to bind CaM is unable to produce a regular growth phenotype in plants. Hence, CaM is essential for the DWF1 function in plant growth.

CaM binding proteins are also known to regulate reproductive development in plants. For instance, the CaM-binding protein kinase in tobacco acts as a negative regulator of flowering. However, these CaM-binding protein kinase are also present in the shoot apical meristem of tobacco and a high concentration of these kinases in the meristem causes a delayed transition to flowering in the plant.

S-locus receptor kinase (SRK) is another protein kinase that interacts with CaM. SRK is involved in the self-incompatibility responses involved in pollen-pistil interactions in Brassica.

CaM targets in Arabidopsis are also involved in pollen development and fertilization. Ca^{2+} transporters are essential for pollen tube growth. Hence, a constant Ca^{2+} gradient is maintained at the apex of pollen tube for elongation during the process of fertilization. Similarly, CaM is also essential at the pollen tube apex, where its primarily role involves the guidance of the pollen tube growth.

=== Interaction with microbes ===
==== Nodule formation ====
Ca^{2+} plays an important role in nodule formation in legumes. Nitrogen is an essential element required in plants and many legumes, unable to fix nitrogen independently, pair symbiotically with nitrogen-fixing bacteria that reduce nitrogen to ammonia. This legume-Rhizobium interaction establishment requires the Nod factor that is produced by the Rhizobium bacteria. The Nod factor is recognized by the root hair cells that are involved in the nodule formation in legumes. Ca^{2+} responses of varied nature are characterized to be involved in the Nod factor recognition. There is a Ca^{2+} flux at the tip of the root hair initially followed by repetitive oscillation of Ca^{2+} in the cytosol and also Ca^{2+} spike occurs around the nucleus. DMI3, an essential gene for Nod factor signaling functions downstream of the Ca^{2+} spiking signature, might be recognizing the Ca^{2+} signature. Further, several CaM and CML genes in Medicago and Lotus are expressed in nodules.

==== Pathogen defense ====
Among the diverse range of defense strategies plants utilize against pathogens, Ca^{2+} signaling is very common. Free Ca^{2+} levels in the cytoplasm increases in response to a pathogenic infection. Ca^{2+} signatures of this nature usually activate the plant defense system by inducing defense-related genes and the hypersensitive cell death. CaMs, CMLs and CaM-binding proteins are some of the recently identified elements of the plant defense signaling pathways. Several CML genes in tobacco, bean and tomato are responsive to pathogens. CML43 is a CaM-related protein that, as isolated from APR134 gene in the disease-resistant leaves of Arabidopsis for gene expression analysis, is rapidly induced when the leaves are inoculated with Pseudomonas syringae. These genes are also found in tomatoes (Solanum lycopersicum). The CML43 from the APR134 also binds to Ca^{2+} ions in vitro which shows that CML43 and APR134 are, hence, involved in the Ca^{2+}-dependent signaling during the plant immune response to bacterial pathogens. The CML9 expression in Arabidopsis thaliana is rapidly induced by phytopathogenic bacteria, flagellin and salicylic acid. Expression of soybean SCaM4 and SCaM5 in transgenic tobacco and Arabidopsis causes an activation of genes related to pathogen resistance and also results in enhanced resistance to a wide spectrum of pathogen infection. The same is not true for soybean SCaM1 and SCaM2 that are highly conserved CaM isoforms. The AtBAG6 protein is a CaM-binding protein that binds to CaM only in the absence of Ca^{2+} and not in the presence of it. AtBAG6 is responsible for the hypersensitive response of programmed cell death in order to prevent the spread of pathogen infection or to restrict pathogen growth. Mutations in the CaM binding proteins can lead to severe effects on the defense response of the plants towards pathogen infections. Cyclic nucleotide-gated channels (CNGCs) are functional protein channels in the plasma membrane that have overlapping CaM binding sites transport divalent cations such as Ca^{2+}. However, the exact role of the positioning of the CNGCs in this pathway for plant defense is still unclear.

=== Abiotic stress response in plants ===
Change in intracellular Ca^{2+} levels is used as a signature for diverse responses towards mechanical stimuli, osmotic and salt treatments, and cold and heat shocks. Different root cell types show a different Ca^{2+} response to osmotic and salt stresses and this implies the cellular specificities of Ca^{2+} patterns. In response to external stress CaM activates glutamate decarboxylase (GAD) that catalyzes the conversion of L-glutamate to GABA. A tight control on the GABA synthesis is important for plant development and, hence, increased GABA levels can essentially affect plant development. Therefore, external stress can affect plant growth and development and CaM are involved in that pathway controlling this effect.

=== Plant examples ===
==== Sorghum ====
The plant sorghum is well established model organism and can adapt in hot and dry environments. For this reason, it is used as a model to study calmodulin's role in plants. Sorghum contains seedlings that express a glycine-rich RNA-binding protein, SbGRBP. This particular protein can be modulated by using heat as a stressor. Its unique location in the cell nucleus and cytosol demonstrates interaction with calmodulin that requires the use of Ca^{2+}. By exposing the plant to versatile stress conditions, it can cause different proteins that enable the plant cells to tolerate environmental changes to become repressed. These modulated stress proteins are shown to interact with CaM. The CaMBP genes expressed in the sorghum are depicted as a “model crop” for researching the tolerance to heat and drought stress.

==== Arabidopsis ====
In an Arabidopsis thaliana study, hundreds of different proteins demonstrated the possibility to bind to CaM in plants.

== Family members in humans ==
- Calmodulin 1 (CALM1)
- Calmodulin 2 (CALM2)
- Calmodulin 3 (CALM3)
- calmodulin 1 pseudogene 1 (CALM1P1)
- Calmodulin-like 3 (CALML3)
- Calmodulin-like 4 (CALML4)
- Calmodulin-like 5 (CALML5)
- Calmodulin-like 6 (CALML6)

== See also ==
- annexin
- Protein kinase
- Ca^{2+}/calmodulin-dependent protein kinase
