= Calpain =

Protease enzyme present in mammals and other organisms

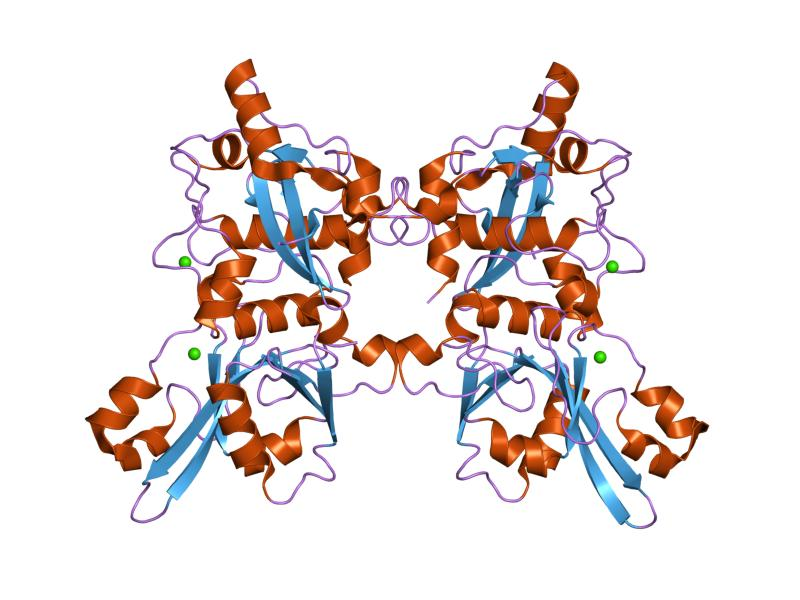
- Crystal structure of the peptidase core of Calpain II.

Identifiers
- Symbol: Calpain
- Pfam: PF00648
- Pfam clan: CL0125
- InterPro: IPR001300
- SMART: CysPc
- PROSITE: PDOC50203
- MEROPS: C2
- SCOP2: 1mdw / SCOPe / SUPFAM
Available protein structures:
- PDB: 1tl9 A:55-354; 1kxr B:55-354; 1tlo A:55-354; 2ary B:55-354; 1zcm A:55-353; 1mdw B:45-344; 1u5i A:45-344; 1kfx L:45-344; 1kfu L:45-344; 1ziv A:42-337 IPR001300 PF00648 (ECOD; PDBsum)
- AlphaFold: IPR001300; PF00648

calpain-1

Identifiers
- EC no.: 3.4.22.52
- CAS no.: 689772-75-6

Databases
- BRENDA: enzyme data
- ExPASy: NiceZyme view
- KEGG: enzyme entry
- MetaCyc: metabolic pathway
- Rhea: reactions
- PDB structures: RCSB PDB PDBe PDBsum
Search
- PMC: articles
- PubMed: articles
- NCBI: proteins

calpain-2

Identifiers
- EC no.: 3.4.22.53
- CAS no.: 702693-80-9

Databases
- BRENDA: enzyme data
- ExPASy: NiceZyme view
- KEGG: enzyme entry
- MetaCyc: metabolic pathway
- Rhea: reactions
- PDB structures: RCSB PDB PDBe PDBsum
Search
- PMC: articles
- PubMed: articles
- NCBI: proteins

A calpain (/ˈkælpeɪn/; EC 3.4.22.52, EC 3.4.22.53) is a protein belonging to the family of calcium-dependent, non-lysosomal cysteine proteases (proteolytic enzymes) expressed ubiquitously in mammals and many other organisms. Calpains constitute the C2 family of protease clan CA in the MEROPS database. The calpain proteolytic system includes the calpain proteases, the small regulatory subunit CAPNS1, also known as CAPN4, and the endogenous calpain-specific inhibitor, calpastatin.

== Discovery ==
The history of calpain's discovery originates in 1964, when calcium-dependent proteolytic activities caused by a "calcium-activated neutral protease" (CANP) were detected in brain, lens of the eye and other tissues. In the late 1960s the enzymes were isolated and characterised independently in both rat brain and skeletal muscle. These activities were caused by an intracellular cysteine protease not associated with the lysosome and having an optimum activity at neutral pH, which clearly distinguished it from the cathepsin family of proteases. The calcium-dependent activity, intracellular localization, and the limited, specific proteolysis on its substrates, highlighted calpain’s role as a regulatory, rather than a digestive, protease. When the sequence of this enzyme became known, it was given the name "calpain", to recognize its common properties with two well-known proteins at the time, the calcium-regulated signalling protein, calmodulin, and the cysteine protease of papaya, papain. Shortly thereafter, the activity was found to be attributable to two main isoforms, dubbed μ ("mu")-calpain and m-calpain (or calpain I and II), that differed primarily in their calcium requirements in vitro. Their names reflect the fact that they are activated by micro- and nearly millimolar concentrations of Ca^{2+} within the cell, respectively.

To date, these two isoforms remain the best characterised members of the calpain family. Structurally, these two heterodimeric isoforms share an identical small (28 kDa) subunit (CAPNS1 (formerly CAPN4)), but have distinct large (80 kDa) subunits, known as calpain 1 and calpain 2 (each encoded by the CAPN1 and CAPN2 genes, respectively).

== Cleavage specificity ==
No specific amino acid sequence is uniquely recognized by calpains. Amongst protein substrates, tertiary structure elements rather than primary amino acid sequences are likely responsible for directing cleavage to a specific substrate. Amongst peptide and small-molecule substrates, the most consistently reported specificity is for small, hydrophobic amino acids (e.g. leucine, valine and isoleucine) at the P2 position, and large hydrophobic amino acids (e.g. phenylalanine and tyrosine) at the P1 position. Arguably, the best currently available fluorogenic calpain substrate is (EDANS)-Glu-Pro-Leu-Phe=Ala-Glu-Arg-Lys-(DABCYL), with cleavage occurring at the Phe=Ala bond.

== Extended family ==
The Human Genome Project has revealed that more than a dozen other calpain isoforms exist, some with multiple splice variants. As the first calpain whose three-dimensional structure was determined, m-calpain is the type-protease for the C2 (calpain) family in the MEROPS database.

Gene	Protein	Aliases	Tissue expression	Disease linkage
CAPN1	Calpain 1	Calpain-1 large subunit, Calpain mu-type	ubiquitous	
CAPN2	Calpain 2	Calpain-2 large subunit, Calpain m-type	ubiquitous	
CAPN3	Calpain 3		skeletal muscle retina and lens specific	Limb Girdle muscular dystrophy 2A
CAPN5	Calpain 5		ubiquitous (high in colon, small intestine and testis)	might be linked to necrosis, as it is an ortholog of the C. elegans necrosis gene tra-3
CAPN6	Calpain 6	CAPNX, Calpamodulin		
CAPN7	Calpain 7	palBH	ubiquitous	
CAPN8	Calpain 8		exclusive to stomach mucosa and the GI tract	might be linked to colon polyp formation
CAPN9	Calpain 9		exclusive to stomach mucosa and the GI tract	might be linked to colon polyp formation
CAPN10	Calpain 10			susceptibility gene for type II diabetes
CAPN11	Calpain 11		testis	
CAPN12	Calpain 12		ubiquitous but high in hair follicle	
CAPN13	Calpain 13		testis and lung	
CAPN14	Calpain 14		ubiquitous	
CAPN17	Calpain 17		Fish and amphibian-only	
SOLH	Calpain 15	Sol H (homolog of the drosophila gene sol)		
CAPNS1	Calpain small subunit 1	Calpain 4		
CAPNS2	Calpain small subunit 2			

== Function ==
Although the physiological role of calpains is still poorly understood, they have been shown to be active participants in processes such as cell mobility and cell cycle progression, as well as cell-type specific functions such as long-term potentiation in neurons and cell fusion in myoblasts. Under these physiological conditions, a transient and localized influx of calcium into the cell activates a small local population of calpains (for example, those close to Ca^{2+} channels), which then advance the signal transduction pathway by catalyzing the controlled proteolysis of its target proteins. Additionally, phosphorylation by protein kinase A and dephosphorylation by alkaline phosphatase have been found to positively regulate the activity of μ-calpains by increasing random coils and decreasing β-sheets in its structure. Phosphorylation improves proteolytic activity and stimulates auto-activation of μ-calpains. However, increased calcium concentration overruns the effects of phosphorylation and dephosphorylation on calpain activity, and thus calpain activity ultimately depends on the presence of calcium. Other reported roles of calpains are in cell function, helping to regulate clotting and the diameter of blood vessels, and playing a role in memory. Calpains have been implicated in apoptotic cell death, and appear to be an essential component of necrosis. Detergent fractionation revealed the cytosolic localization of calpain.

Enhanced calpain activity, regulated by CAPNS1, significantly contributes to platelet hyperreactivity under hypoxic environment.

In the brain, while μ-calpain is mainly located in the cell body and dendrites of neurons and to a lesser extent in axons and glial cells, m-calpain is found in glia and a small number in axons. Calpain is also involved in skeletal muscle protein breakdown due to exercise and altered nutritional states.

== Clinical significance ==
=== Pathology ===
The structural and functional diversity of calpains in the cell is reflected in their involvement in the pathogenesis of a wide range of disorders. At least two well known genetic disorders and one form of cancer have been linked to tissue-specific calpains. When defective, the mammalian calpain 3 (also known as p94) is the gene product responsible for limb-girdle muscular dystrophy type 2A, calpain 10 has been identified as a susceptibility gene for type II diabetes mellitus, and calpain 9 has been identified as a tumour suppressor for gastric cancer. Moreover, the hyperactivation of calpains is implicated in a number of pathologies associated with altered calcium homeostasis such as Alzheimer's disease, and cataract formation, as well as secondary degeneration resulting from acute cellular stress following myocardial ischemia, cerebral (neuronal) ischemia, traumatic brain injury and spinal cord injury. Excessive amounts of calpain can be activated due to Ca^{2+} influx after cerebrovascular accident (during the ischemic cascade) or some types of traumatic brain injury such as diffuse axonal injury. Increase in concentration of calcium in the cell results in calpain activation, which leads to unregulated proteolysis of both target and non-target proteins and consequent irreversible tissue damage. Excessively active calpain breaks down molecules in the cytoskeleton such as spectrin, microtubule subunits, microtubule-associated proteins, and neurofilaments. It may also damage ion channels, other enzymes, cell adhesion molecules, and cell surface receptors. This can lead to degradation of the cytoskeleton and plasma membrane. Calpain may also break down sodium channels that have been damaged due to axonal stretch injury, leading to an influx of sodium into the cell. This, in turn, leads to the neuron's depolarization and the influx of more Ca^{2+}. A significant consequence of calpain activation is the development of cardiac contractile dysfunction that follows ischemic insult to the heart. Upon reperfusion of the ischemic myocardium, there is development of calcium overload or excess in the heart cell (cardiomyocytes). This increase in calcium leads to activation of calpain. Recently calpain has been implicated in promoting high altitude induced venous thrombosis by mediating platelet hyperactivation.

=== Therapeutic inhibitors ===
The exogenous regulation of calpain activity is therefore of interest for the development of therapeutics in a wide array of pathological states. As a few of the many examples supporting the therapeutic potential of calpain inhibition in ischemia, calpain inhibitor AK275 protected against focal ischemic brain damage in rats when administered after ischemia, and MDL28170 significantly reduced the size of damaged infarct tissue in a rat focal ischemia model. Also, calpain inhibitors are known to have neuroprotective effects: PD150606, SJA6017, ABT-705253, and SNJ-1945.

Calpain may be released in the brain for up to a month after a head injury, and may be responsible for a shrinkage of the brain sometimes found after such injuries. However, calpain may also be involved in a "resculpting" process that helps repair damage after injury.

== See also ==
- The Proteolysis Map
