= Serena Dudek =

Female neuroscientist in the United States

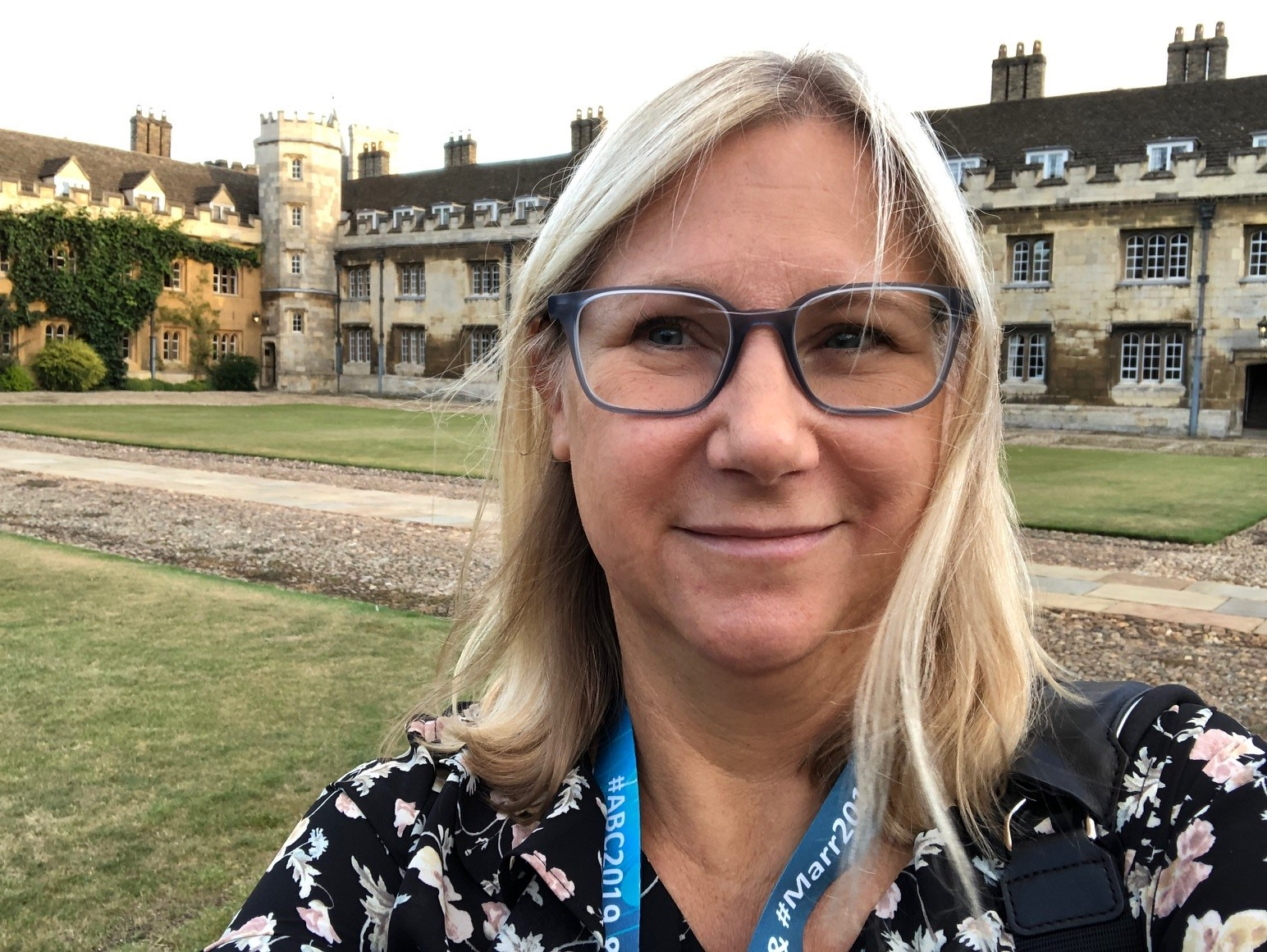
- Born: 1964 (age 61–62); Anaheim, California
- Education: University of California, Irvine; Brown University
- Spouse: Marc Sommer
- Children: 1
- Awards: A.E. Bennett Research Award (2009)

Serena M. Dudek (born 1964; Anaheim, California), is an American neuroscientist known for her work on long-term depression and synaptic plasticity in the CA2 region of the hippocampus.

== Early life and education ==
Dudek's father was an English professor at Fullerton College, and her mother was a clinical cytologist and medical technologist. In high school, she worked at Knott's Berry Farm, selling ice cream and popcorn. She was also on the drill team at Savanna High School.

In 1982, Serena Dudek matriculated into the University of California, Irvine. Dudek worked as an undergraduate researcher in the lab of Gary Lynch, studying the degradation of brain spectrin, also known as fodrin, by calpains.

Serena Dudek enrolled a Ph.D. program at Brown University where she joined Mark Bear's lab to study long-term depression in a collaboration with Leon Cooper. Her work was used to support the BCM theory. She finished her Ph.D. studies in 1992.

== Career ==
After receiving her doctorate, Dudek did post-doctoral work at the University of Alabama at Birmingham. and with the National Institute of Child Health and Human Development. In 2001, Dudek started working at the NIEHS, where she is now a Senior Investigator. Within the NIEHS, she is currently the Acting Chief of the Neurobiology Laboratory, as well as the head of the Synaptic and Developmental Plasticity Group.

=== Publications ===
On August 26, 2007 with the Duke University Medical Center, Dudek et al published a paper on their research on brain proteins in mice related to Obsessive-compulsive disorder (OCD). The SAPAP3 protein plays a crucial role in nerve signals traveling to another across the synapse within the striatum. Additional gene mutations that are mirrored in humans are hypothesized to play a role within OCD in humans too.

On September 19, 2010 Dudek et al published a paper titled "Gene limits learning and memory in mice" which studied the effect of a specific gene deletion on cognitive performance in mice.

On November 12, 2024 Dudek et al. published her book titled, "Transcriptional Regulation by Neuronal Activity." ed. 2. Within this book, Dudek seeks to introduce major advancements in the neuroscience field, beginning from the end of her first edition book, regarding the regulation of gene transcription by neurological activities. Such activities can include "neural development and the refinement of neuronal connections to learning response to injury."

=== News articles ===
In a Newsweek article called "Buff Your Brain" Serena Dudek and her colleagues' 2011 research on the effects of caffeine in lab rodents was highlighted. Serena Dudek's research found that rats that were given an equivalent shot of two cups of coffee had stronger electrical activity between neurons in their hippocampus area called CA2.

In Laboratory News article named "Doh! Losing ‘Homer Simpson’ gene makes mice smart," Dudek was cited for her study on electrical currents on mice. The article highlights how mice with the disabled "Homer Simpson" gene were able to have stronger neuron connections in the hippocampus area called CA2.

In Scientific American Article titled "Knocking Out a 'Dumb' Gene Boosts Memory in Mice", Dudek rationalizes why we would have a "dumb" gene, explaining that, "If the gene is conserved by natural selection, there must be some reason. Intuitively, it seems there should be a downside to having this gene knocked out, but we haven’t found it so far. It may be that these mice are hallucinating, and you just can’t tell."

In an article titled "Coffee for your thoughts: New study suggests caffeine can help learning, memory" from the Columbia Chronicle, Dudek discussed her work on the CA2 region of the hippocampus. She discusses her work in which she observed the CA2 region in rats after administering caffeine. Her team then removed and observed the rat brains and found that caffeine improved synaptic strength in the CA2 region of the brain.

An article from The Pilot entitled, "UNC Pembroke Professor, Biotech Center Team Identify Dementia-Related Brain Alterations due to Military Blasts", Dudek and other researchers are cited on their work concerning the neurological effects from explosive blasts.

In 2012, Dudek's work on caffeine's effect on neuronal connection was highlighted in Newsweek, supporting the research of electrical activity of neurons on cognitive functioning.

== Activities ==
Ever since 1987, Serena Dudek has been a part of the Society for Neuroscience: Washington, DC, US. From October, 2019 to October 2020, she served as the treasurer of the society.

== Awards ==
- 2009 - A.E. Bennett Research Award from the Society of Biological Psychiatry
