= NIDDM1 =

Segment on human chromosome 2

The NIDDM1 genetic linkage region refers to a segment on chromosome 2q that was first identified through genome-wide scans in families with type 2 diabetes, particularly among Mexican American populations. Early genetic studies detected a strong linkage signal in this region, leading to the designation "NIDDM1" (Non-Insulin Dependent Diabetes Mellitus 1), which suggested a major contribution to disease risk in these groups. Subsequent research and fine-mapping uncovered the calpain-10 gene (CAPN10) within the NIDDM1 locus, marking it as the first type 2 diabetes susceptibility gene found by positional cloning, though later studies showed that this region signifies a complex cluster of genetic contributions and the term NIDDM1 is now considered obsolete.
