= Calpain-1 catalytic subunit =

Protein found in humans

CAPN1
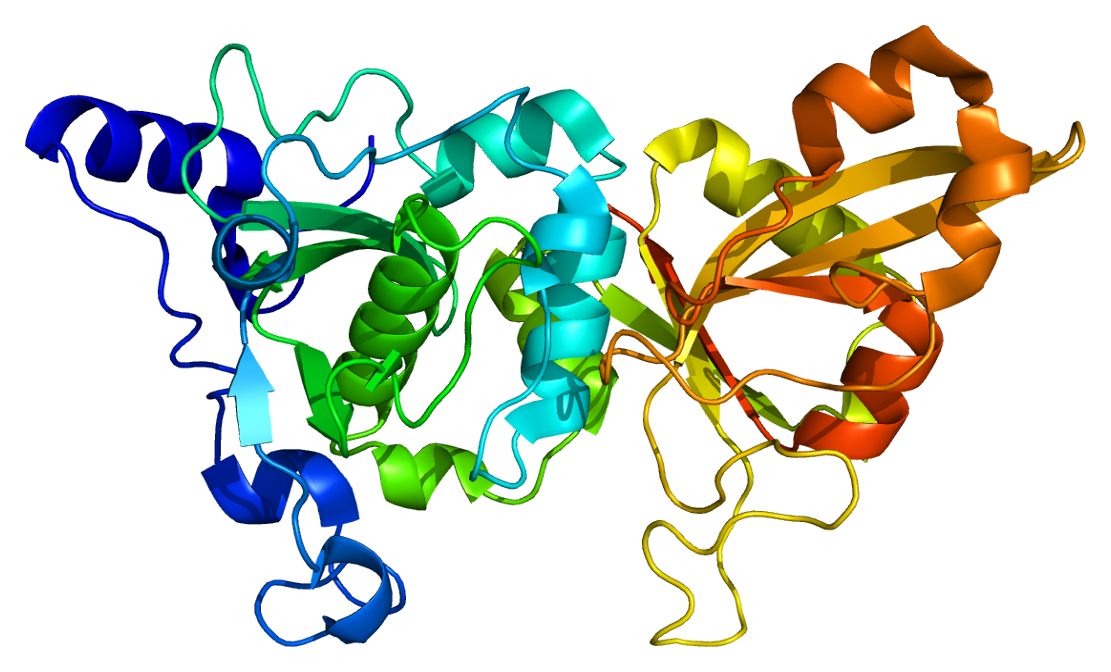

Identifiers
- Aliases: CAPN1, CANP, CANP1, CANPL1, muCANP, muCL, SPG76, calpain 1
- External IDs: OMIM: 114220; MGI: 88263; GeneCards: CAPN1
Available structures
PDB	Ortholog search: PDBe RCSB
PDB	List of PDB id codes 1ZCM, 2ARY
Enzyme activity
EC #	BRENDA	ExPASy	KEGG	MetaCyc
3.4.22.52	↗	↗	↗	↗

Gene location (Human)
Chr.	Chromosome 11 (human)
Band	11q13.1	Start	65,180,566 bp
Band	11q13.1	End	65,212,006 bp

Gene location (Mouse)
Chr.	Chromosome 19 (mouse)
Band	19 A|19 4.34 cM	Start	6,038,573 bp
Band	19 A|19 4.34 cM	End	6,065,927 bp
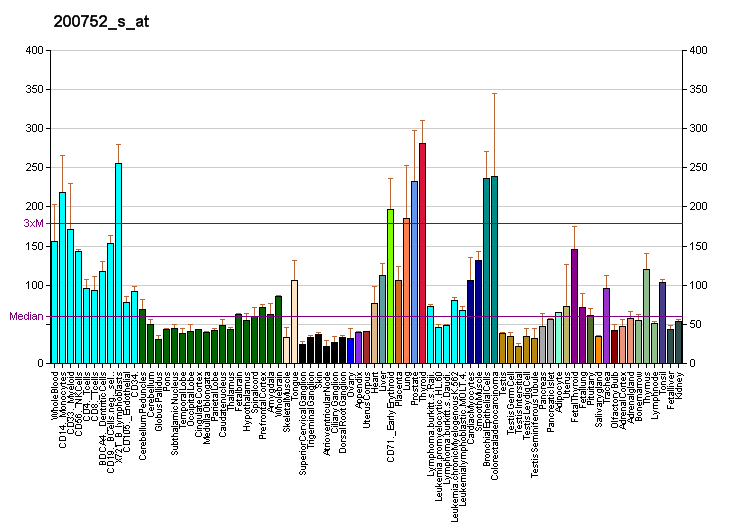
RNA expression pattern
Bgee	Human / Mouse (ortholog); Top expressed in: mucosa of transverse colon; skin of leg; skin of abdomen; minor salivary glands; right uterine tube; right lobe of thyroid gland; olfactory zone of nasal mucosa; left lobe of thyroid gland; gallbladder; ectocervix / Top expressed in: granulocyte; lip; transitional epithelium of urinary bladder; esophagus; muscle of thigh; corneal stroma; lumbar spinal ganglion; ankle; triceps brachii muscle; knee joint; More reference expression data
BioGPS	More reference expression data
Gene ontology
Molecular function	cysteine-type peptidase activity; metal ion binding; peptidase activity; protein binding; hydrolase activity; endopeptidase activity; calcium ion binding; calcium-dependent cysteine-type endopeptidase activity
Cellular component	membrane; focal adhesion; intracellular anatomical structure; mitochondrion; lysosome; extracellular exosome; cytosol; extracellular region; cytoplasm; plasma membrane; ficolin-1-rich granule lumen
Biological process	extracellular matrix disassembly; receptor catabolic process; positive regulation of cell population proliferation; regulation of macroautophagy; mammary gland involution; neutrophil degranulation; regulation of catalytic activity; cornification; self proteolysis; proteolysis; regulation of NMDA receptor activity
Sources:Amigo / QuickGO
Orthologs
Databases	NCBI: entry; OMA: entry
Species	Human	Mouse
Entrez	823	12333
Ensembl	ENSG00000014216	ENSMUSG00000024942
UniProt	P07384	O35350
RefSeq (mRNA)	NM_001198868; NM_001198869; NM_005186	NM_001110504; NM_007600
RefSeq (protein)	NP_001185797; NP_001185798; NP_005177	NP_001103974; NP_031626
Location (UCSC)	Chr 11: 65.18 – 65.21 Mb	Chr 19: 6.04 – 6.07 Mb
PubMed search
- Wikidata
View/Edit Human	View/Edit Mouse

Calpain-1 catalytic subunit (CAPN 1) is a protein that in humans is encoded by the CAPN1 gene.

== Function ==
The calpains, calcium-activated neutral proteases, are nonlysosomal, intracellular cysteine proteases. The mammalian calpains include ubiquitous, stomach-specific, and muscle-specific proteins. The ubiquitous enzymes consist of heterodimers with distinct large, catalytic subunits associated with a common small, regulatory subunit. This gene encodes the large subunit of the ubiquitous enzyme, calpain 1.

== Interactions ==
CAPN1 has been shown to interact with PSEN2.
