= Charles Elbaum =

American physicist (1926–2018)

Charles Elbaum (May 15, 1926 – March 4, 2018) was an American physicist.

Charles Elbaum was born in Lublin, Poland to parents Chil and Hannah Elbaum. After World War II, he moved to Belgium and Paris before earning a master's and doctorate from the University of Toronto.

In 1959, Elbaum began teaching at Brown University as an assistant professor of applied physics. Later, he was granted fellowship in the American Physical Society. Elbaum chaired the department of physics between 1980 and 1986, and was named the Hazard Professor of Physics in 1991. Along with colleague Leon Cooper, he founded the tech company Nestor, dedicated to finding commercial applications for neural networks. He retired in 2001, staying on as a research professor.
