= Leon Cooper =

American physicist and neuroscientist (1930–2024)

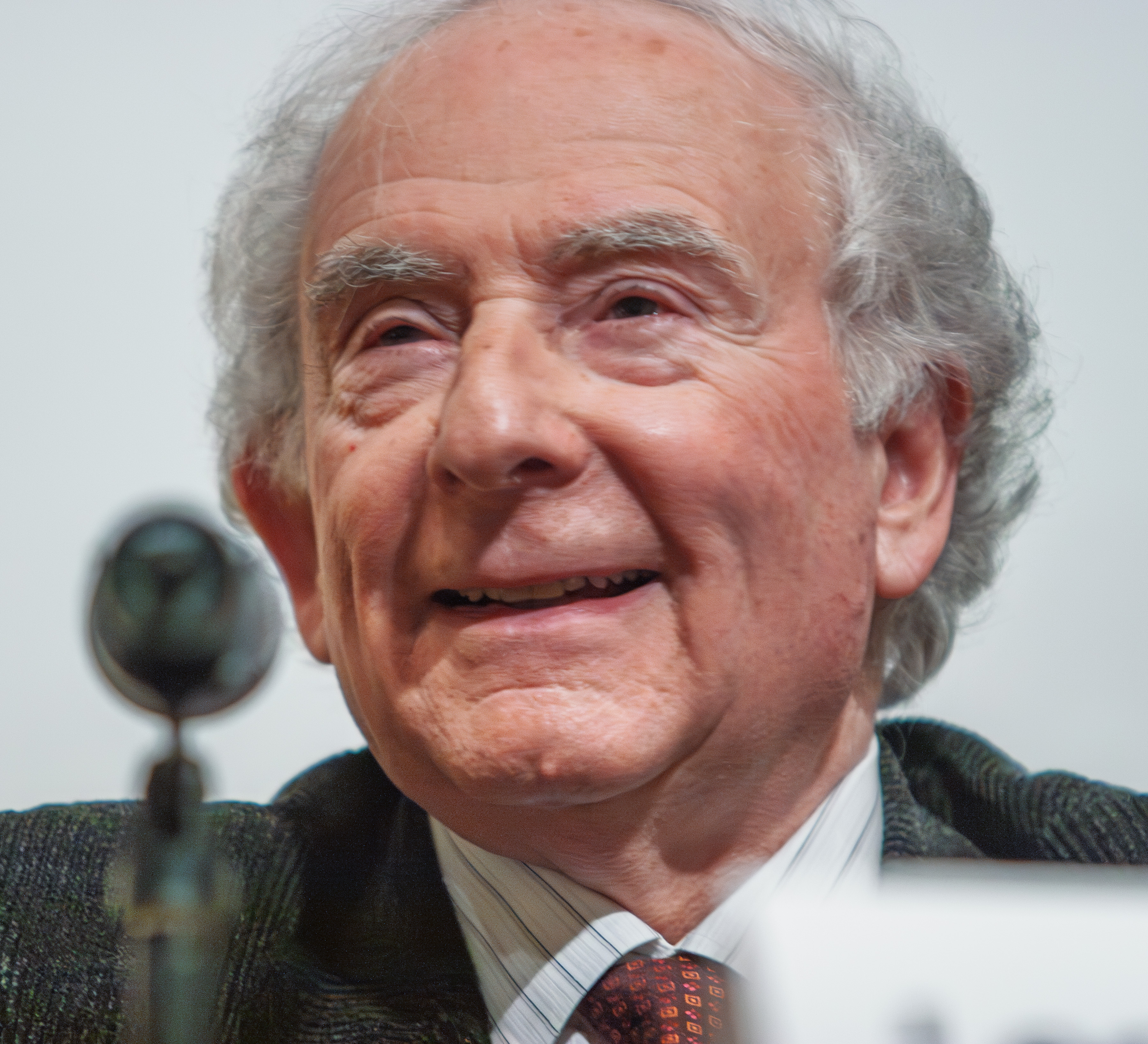
- Cooper in 2007
- Born: Leon N. Kupchik; February 28, 1930; New York City, U.S.
- Died: October 23, 2024 (aged 94); Providence, Rhode Island, U.S.
- Education: Columbia University: B.A., Physics; M.A., Physics; Ph.D., Physics
- Known for: Cooper pairs; BCM theory; BCS theory
- Spouse: Kay Allard (m. 1969)
- Awards: Comstock Prize in Physics (1968); Nobel Prize in Physics (1972); John Jay Award (1985)
- Scientific career
- Fields: Physics; Neuroscience
- Workplaces: Brown University
- Thesis: Mu-mesonic atoms and the electromagnetic radius of the nucleus (1954)
- Doctoral advisor: Robert Serber

Leon N. Cooper (Note: His middle initial N. does not stand for anything, though some sources erroneously suggested his middle name was Neil.) (né Kupchik; February 28, 1930 – October 23, 2024) was an American theoretical physicist and neuroscientist who shared the 1972 Nobel Prize in Physics for his work on superconductivity. Cooper developed the concept of Cooper pairs and collaborated with John Bardeen and John Robert Schrieffer to develop the BCS theory of conventional superconductivity. In neuroscience, Cooper co-developed the BCM theory of synaptic plasticity.

== Early life and education ==
Leon N. Kupchick was born on February 28, 1930 in The Bronx, New York City. His father, Irving Kupchik, was from Belarus and moved to the United States after the Russian Revolution in 1917. His mother, Anna Zola, was from Poland; she died when Leon was seven. His father changed the family's surname from Kupchick to Cooper when he remarried.

Leon attended the Bronx High School of Science, graduating in 1947. He then studied at Columbia University, where he graduated with a Bachelor of Arts in 1951. He remained at Columbia for graduate school, receiving a Master of Arts in 1953 and a Doctor of Philosophy the following year. His doctoral thesis was on the subject of muonic atoms and the charge radius.

== Career ==
Cooper spent one year as a postdoctoral researcher at the Institute for Advanced Study in Princeton. New Jersey. He then taught at the University of Illinois and Ohio State University before joining Brown University in 1958. He would remain at Brown for the rest of his career.

Cooper founded Brown's Institute for Brain and Neural Systems in 1973, becoming its first director. In 1974 he was appointed Professor of Science at Brown, an endowed chair funded by Thomas J. Watson Sr. Cooper held visiting research positions at various institutions including the Institute for Advanced Study in Princeton, New Jersey, and at CERN (European Organization for Nuclear Research) in Geneva, Switzerland.

Along with colleague Charles Elbaum, he founded the tech company Nestor in 1975, which sought commercial applications for artificial neural networks. Nestor partnered with Intel to develop the Ni1000 neural network computer chip in 1994.

== Research ==
=== Superconductivity ===
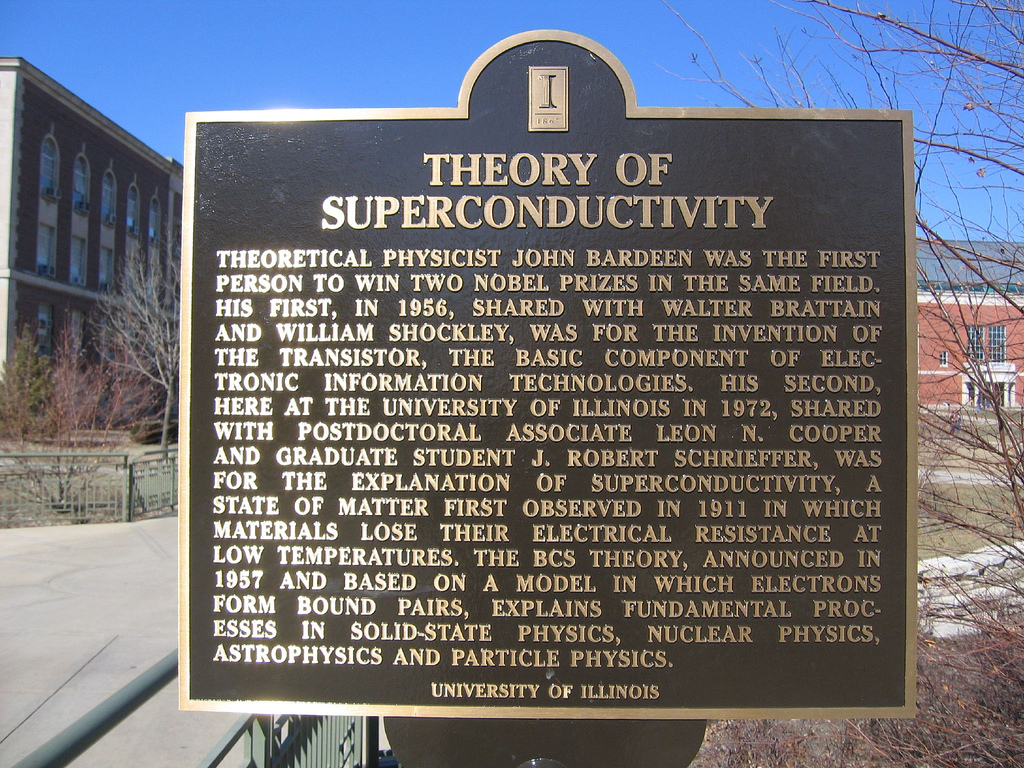
Plaque at the University of Illinois, commemorating the development of the BCS theory of superconductivity

While Cooper was a postdoc at Princeton, he was approached by John Bardeen, a professor at the University of Illinois, and Bardeen's graduate student John Robert Schrieffer. Bardeen and Schrieffer were working on superconductivity, a topic which was new to Cooper, but he agreed to collaborate with them. Superconductivity had been experimentally discovered in 1911, but there was no theoretical explanation for the phenomenon. Cooper moved to Illinois as a postdoc to work with Bardeen.

After a year of theoretical investigation, Cooper developed the idea of a quasiparticle composed of two bound electrons, now known as a Cooper pair. Cooper published his concept of Cooper pairs in Physical Review in September 1956. The movement of Cooper pairs through a low-temperature metal would be almost unimpeded, producing a very low electrical resistance. After further development, Bardeen, Cooper and Schrieffer showed how this could produce superconductivity, publishing their theory in Physical Reviews in two papers during 1957. This theory became known as the BCS theory, after the authors' initials, and is widely accepted as the explanation for conventional superconductivity. Bardeen, Schrieffer and Cooper were awarded the Nobel Prize in Physics in 1972 for their theory.

=== Neuroscience ===
After joining Brown University, Cooper became interested in neuroscience, particularly the process of learning. In 1982, Cooper and two doctoral students, Elie Bienenstock and Paul Munro, published their theory of synaptic plasticity in The Journal of Neuroscience. They estimated the weakening and strengthening of synapses that could occur without saturation of the connections. As synapses saturate, electrical connections become less effective, thereby reducing the saturation. Connections therefore oscillate between saturation and unsaturation without reaching their limits. Their theory explained how the visual cortex works and how people learn to see. It became known as the BCM theory, after the authors' initials.

== Personal life ==
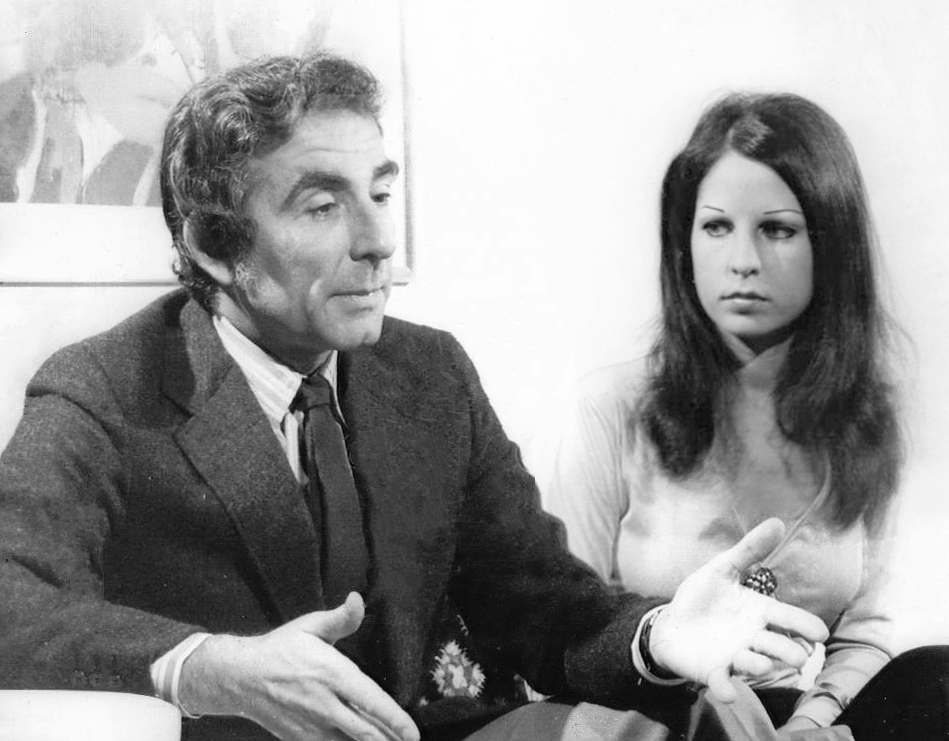
Cooper with his wife, Kay Allard, in 1972

Cooper first married Martha Kennedy, with whom he had two daughters. In 1969, he married for a second time, to Kay Allard. He died at his home in Providence, Rhode Island, on October 23, 2024, at the age of 94.

== Recognition ==
=== Awards ===
Year	Organization	Award	Co-recipients	Citation	Ref.
1968	National Academy of Sciences	Comstock Prize in Physics	John Robert Schrieffer	—	
1972	Swedish Academy of Sciences	Nobel Prize in Physics	John Bardeen and John Robert Schrieffer	"For their jointly developed theory of superconductivity, usually called the BCS-theory."	
1985	Columbia University	John Jay Award	—	—	

=== Memberships ===
Year	Organization	Type	Ref.
1973	American Philosophical Society	Member	
1974	American Academy of Arts and Sciences	Member	
1975	National Academy of Sciences	Member	

=== Honorary degrees ===
Year	University	Degree	Ref.
1973	University of Sussex	Doctor of Science	
1974	Brown University	Doctor of Science	
1976	Ohio State University	Doctor of Science	

== Publications ==
Cooper was the author of Science and Human Experience – a collection of essays, including previously unpublished material, on issues such as consciousness and the structure of space. (Cambridge University Press, 2014).

Cooper also wrote an unconventional liberal-arts physics textbook, originally An Introduction to the Meaning and Structure of Physics (Harper and Row, 1968) and still in print in a somewhat condensed form as Physics: Structure and Meaning (Lebanon: New Hampshire, University Press of New England, 1992).

- Cooper, L. N. & J. Rainwater. "Theory of Multiple Coulomb Scattering from Extended Nuclei", Nevis Cyclotron Laboratories at Columbia University, Office of Naval Research (ONR), United States Department of Energy (through predecessor agency the Atomic Energy Commission), (August 1954).
- Cooper, Leon N. (1956). "Bound Electron Pairs in a Degenerate Fermi Gas". Physical Review. 104 (4): 1189–1190. Bibcode:1956PhRv..104.1189C. doi:10.1103/PhysRev.104.1189.
- Bardeen, J.; Cooper, L. N.; Schrieffer, J. R. (1957). "Microscopic Theory of Superconductivity". Physical Review. 106 (1): 162–164. Bibcode:1957PhRv..106..162B. doi:10.1103/PhysRev.106.162.
- Bardeen, J.; Cooper, L. N.; Schrieffer, J. R. (1957). "Theory of Superconductivity". Physical Review. 108 (5): 1175–1204. Bibcode:1957PhRv..108.1175B. doi:10.1103/PhysRev.108.1175.
- Cooper, L. N., Lee, H. J., Schwartz, B. B. & W. Silvert. "Theory of the Knight Shift and Flux Quantization in Superconductors", Brown University, United States Department of Energy (through predecessor agency the Atomic Energy Commission), (May 1962).
- Cooper, L. N. & Feldman, D. "BCS: 50 years", World Scientific Publishing Co., (November 2010).

== See also ==
- List of Jewish Nobel laureates
