= Calpastatin =

Protein found in humans

CAST

Identifiers
- Aliases: CAST, BS-17, PLACK, calpastatin
- External IDs: OMIM: 114090; MGI: 1098236; GeneCards: CAST

Gene location (Human)
Chr.	Chromosome 5 (human)
Band	5q15	Start	96,525,267 bp
Band	5q15	End	96,779,595 bp

Gene location (Mouse)
Chr.	Chromosome 13 (mouse)
Band	13|13 C1	Start	74,840,487 bp
Band	13|13 C1	End	74,956,929 bp
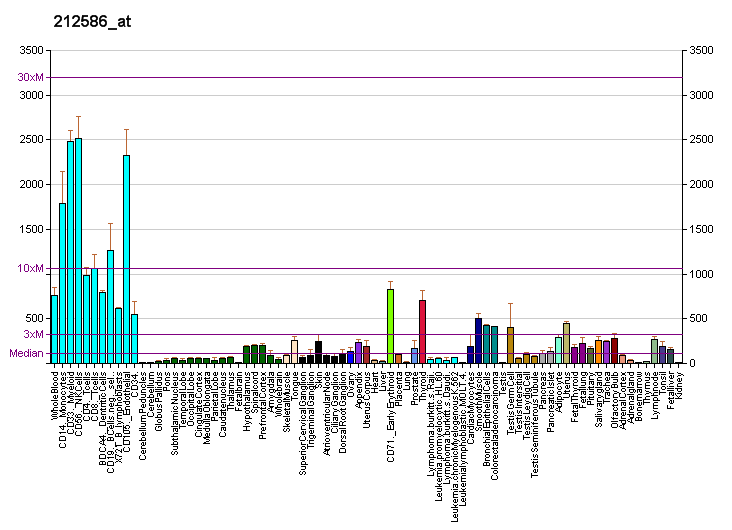

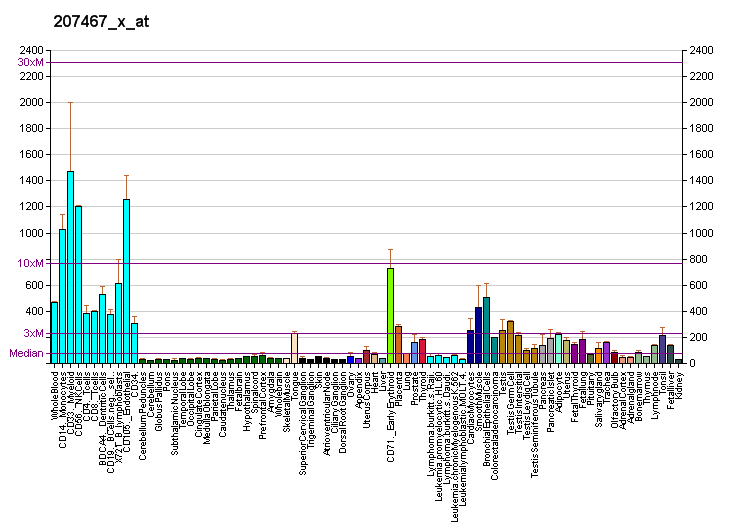

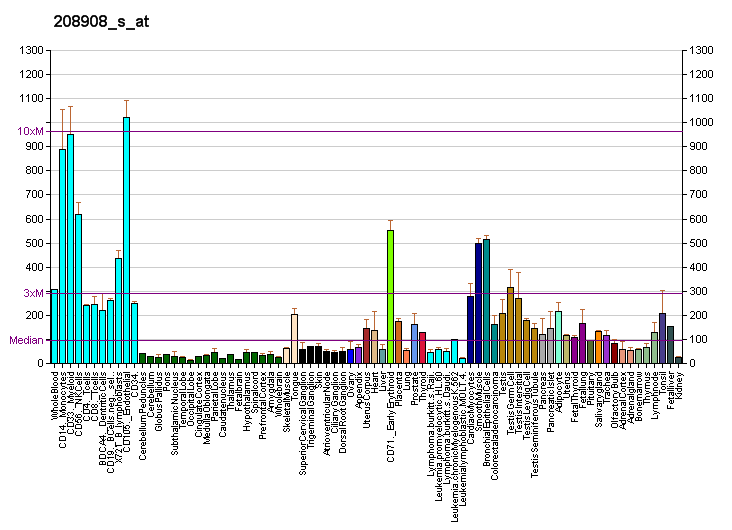
RNA expression pattern
Bgee	Human / Mouse (ortholog); Top expressed in: Achilles tendon; bronchial epithelial cell; epithelium of colon; human penis; synovial joint; oral cavity; urethra; skin of thigh; mucosa of pharynx; skin of hip / Top expressed in: spermatid; skin of external ear; granulocyte; seminiferous tubule; lip; esophagus; transitional epithelium of urinary bladder; muscle of thigh; stroma of bone marrow; triceps brachii muscle; More reference expression data
BioGPS	More reference expression data
Gene ontology
Molecular function	peptidase inhibitor activity; cysteine-type endopeptidase inhibitor activity; protein binding; endopeptidase inhibitor activity; RNA binding; cadherin binding; calcium-dependent cysteine-type endopeptidase inhibitor activity; protease binding
Cellular component	endoplasmic reticulum; membrane; cytosol
Biological process	negative regulation of peptidase activity; negative regulation of type B pancreatic cell apoptotic process; inhibition of cysteine-type endopeptidase activity; presynaptic active zone organization
Sources:Amigo / QuickGO
Orthologs
Databases	NCBI: entry; OMA: entry
Species	Human	Mouse
Entrez	831	12380
Ensembl	ENSG00000153113	ENSMUSG00000021585
UniProt	P20810	P51125
RefSeq (mRNA)	NM_001042440; NM_001042441; NM_001042442; NM_001042443; NM_001042444 NM_001042445; NM_001042446; NM_001190442; NM_001284212; NM_001284213; NM_001750; NM_173060; NM_173061; NM_173062; NM_173063; NM_001330626; NM_001330627; NM_001330628; NM_001330629; NM_001330630; NM_001330631; NM_001330632; NM_001330633; NM_001330634; NM_001375317	NM_001301153; NM_001301155; NM_001301156; NM_001301157; NM_001301158 NM_001301160; NM_001301181; NM_009817
RefSeq (protein)	NP_001035905; NP_001035906; NP_001035907; NP_001035908; NP_001035909 NP_001035910; NP_001035911; NP_001177371; NP_001271141; NP_001271142; NP_001317555; NP_001317556; NP_001317557; NP_001317558; NP_001317559; NP_001317560; NP_001317561; NP_001317562; NP_001317563; NP_001741; NP_775083; NP_001362246	NP_001288082; NP_001288084; NP_001288085; NP_001288086; NP_001288087 NP_001288089; NP_001288110; NP_033947
Location (UCSC)	Chr 5: 96.53 – 96.78 Mb	Chr 13: 74.84 – 74.96 Mb
PubMed search
- Wikidata
View/Edit Human	View/Edit Mouse

Calpastatin is a protein that in humans is encoded by the CAST gene.

The protein encoded by this gene is an endogenous calpain (calcium-dependent cysteine protease) inhibitor. It consists of an N-terminal domain L and four repetitive calpain-inhibition domains (domains 1–4), and it is involved in the proteolysis of amyloid precursor protein. The calpain/calpastatin system is involved in numerous membrane fusion events, such as neural vesicle exocytosis and platelet and red-cell aggregation. The encoded protein is also thought to affect the expression levels of genes encoding structural or regulatory proteins. Several alternatively spliced transcript variants of this gene have been described, but the full-length natures of only some have been determined.
