= Calpain small subunit 1 =

Protein found in humans

CAPNS1

Identifiers
- Aliases: CAPNS1, 30K, CALPAIN4, CANP, CANPS, CAPN4, CDPS, CSS1, calpain small subunit 1, Calpain small subunit 1
- External IDs: OMIM: 114170; MGI: 88266; GeneCards: CAPNS1
Available structures
PDB	Ortholog search: PDBe RCSB
PDB	List of PDB id codes 1KFU, 1KFX, 4PHJ, 4PHK, 4PHM, 4WQ2, 4WQ3, 5D69

Gene location (Human)
Chr.	Chromosome 19 (human)
Band	19q13.12	Start	36,139,953 bp
Band	19q13.12	End	36,150,353 bp

Gene location (Mouse)
Chr.	Chromosome 7 (mouse)
Band	7 B1|7 17.31 cM	Start	29,886,361 bp
Band	7 B1|7 17.31 cM	End	29,898,236 bp
RNA expression pattern
Bgee	Human / Mouse (ortholog); Top expressed in: stromal cell of endometrium; mucosa of ileum; granulocyte; prefrontal cortex; right frontal lobe; right uterine tube; right lung; upper lobe of left lung; right lobe of thyroid gland; left lobe of thyroid gland / Top expressed in: spermatid; spermatocyte; genital tubercle; tail of embryo; ankle; granulocyte; muscle of thigh; corneal stroma; dentate gyrus of hippocampal formation granule cell; facial motor nucleus; More reference expression data
BioGPS	n/a
Gene ontology
Molecular function	calcium ion binding; protein binding; calcium-dependent cysteine-type endopeptidase activity; metal ion binding; endopeptidase activity
Cellular component	cytoplasm; extracellular exosome; membrane; cytosol; plasma membrane
Biological process	extracellular matrix disassembly; regulation of macroautophagy; positive regulation of cell population proliferation; proteolysis; cornification
Sources:Amigo / QuickGO
Orthologs
Databases	NCBI: entry; OMA: entry
Species	Human	Mouse
Entrez	826	12336
Ensembl	ENSG00000126247	ENSMUSG00000001794
UniProt	P04632	O88456
RefSeq (mRNA)	NM_001003962; NM_001302632; NM_001302633; NM_001749	NM_009795
RefSeq (protein)	NP_001003962; NP_001289561; NP_001289562; NP_001740	NP_033925
Location (UCSC)	Chr 19: 36.14 – 36.15 Mb	Chr 7: 29.89 – 29.9 Mb
PubMed search
- Wikidata
View/Edit Human	View/Edit Mouse

Calpain small subunit 1 (CSS1) is a protein that in humans is encoded by the CAPNS1 gene.

== Function ==
Calpains are a ubiquitous, well-conserved family of calcium-dependent, cysteine proteases. Calpain families have been implicated in neurodegenerative processes, as their activation can be triggered by calcium influx and oxidative stress. Calpain I and II are heterodimeric with distinct large subunits associated with common small subunits, all of which are encoded by different genes. The small regulatory subunit consists of an N-terminal domain, containing about 30% glycine residues and a C-terminal Ca-binding domain. Two transcript variants encoding the same protein have been identified for this gene.

== Functions ==
=== Myotonic dystrophy ===
This gene encodes a small subunit common to both calpain I and II and is associated with myotonic dystrophy.

=== Biomarker ===
'Elevated expression of CAPNS1 has been found to be associated with progression of various cancers such as hepatocellular and renal carcinoma.
