= Calpain-8 =

Protein found in humans

CAPN8

Identifiers
- Aliases: CAPN8, nCL-2, calpain 8
- External IDs: MGI: 2181366; GeneCards: CAPN8
Enzyme activity
EC #	BRENDA	ExPASy	KEGG	MetaCyc
3.4.22.53	↗	↗	↗	↗

Gene location (Human)
Chr.	Chromosome 1 (human)
Band	1q41	Start	223,538,007 bp
Band	1q41	End	223,665,723 bp

Gene location (Mouse)
Chr.	Chromosome 1 (mouse)
Band	1|1 H5	Start	182,392,572 bp
Band	1|1 H5	End	182,459,917 bp
RNA expression pattern
Bgee	Human / Mouse (ortholog); Top expressed in: mucosa of transverse colon; mucosa of ileum; pylorus; gastric mucosa; pancreatic ductal cell; rectum; upper lobe of left lung; body of stomach; gallbladder; mucosa of sigmoid colon / Top expressed in: pyloric antrum; epithelium of stomach; mucous cell of stomach; hair follicle; lip; embryo; embryo; duodenum; skin of abdomen; left colon; More reference expression data
BioGPS	n/a
Gene ontology
Molecular function	peptidase activity; hydrolase activity; cysteine-type peptidase activity; metal ion binding; calcium ion binding; calcium-dependent cysteine-type endopeptidase activity
Cellular component	Golgi apparatus; intracellular anatomical structure; cytoplasm
Biological process	proteolysis; digestion
Sources:Amigo / QuickGO
Orthologs
Databases	NCBI: entry; OMA: entry
Species	Human	Mouse
Entrez	388743	170725
Ensembl	ENSG00000203697	ENSMUSG00000038599
UniProt	A6NHC0; A3QK37	Q91VA3
RefSeq (mRNA)	NM_001143962	NM_001145806; NM_130890
RefSeq (protein)	NP_001137434	NP_001139278; NP_570960
Location (UCSC)	Chr 1: 223.54 – 223.67 Mb	Chr 1: 182.39 – 182.46 Mb
PubMed search
- Wikidata
View/Edit Human	View/Edit Mouse

Calpain-8 is a protein in humans that is encoded by the CAPN8 gene.
