= Calpain-2 catalytic subunit =

Protein found in humans

CAPN2
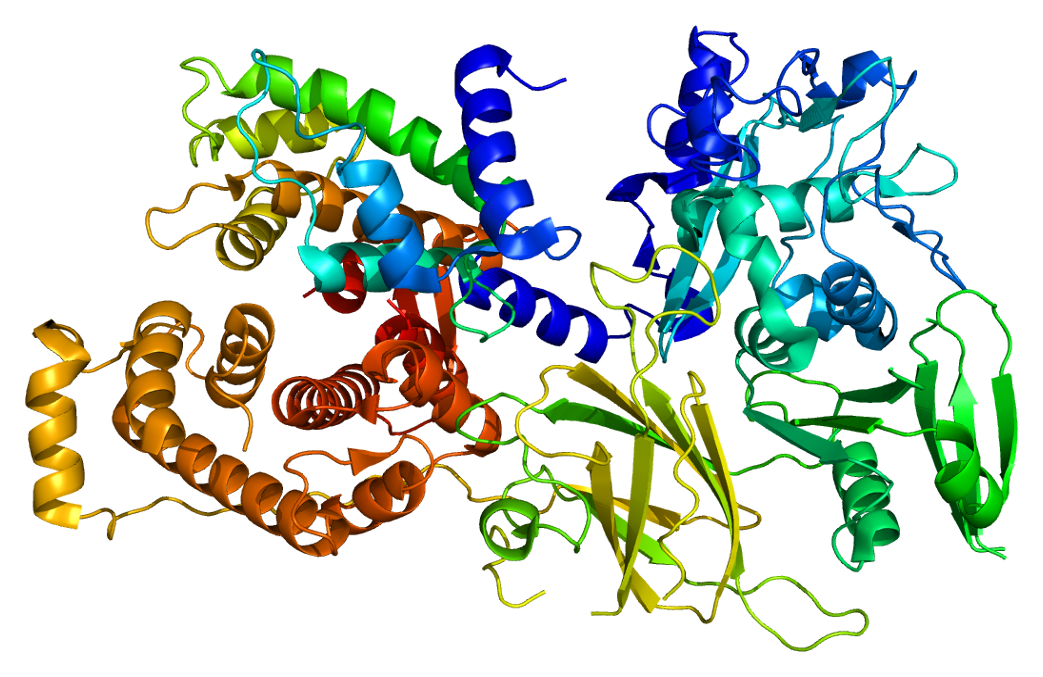

Identifiers
- Aliases: CAPN2, CANP2, CANPL2, CANPml, mCANP, calpain 2
- External IDs: OMIM: 114230; MGI: 88264; GeneCards: CAPN2
Available structures
PDB	Ortholog search: PDBe RCSB
PDB	List of PDB id codes 1KFU, 1KFX, 2NQA
Enzyme activity
EC #	BRENDA	ExPASy	KEGG	MetaCyc
3.4.22.53	↗	↗	↗	↗

Gene location (Human)
Chr.	Chromosome 1 (human)
Band	1q41	Start	223,701,593 bp
Band	1q41	End	223,776,018 bp

Gene location (Mouse)
Chr.	Chromosome 1 (mouse)
Band	1|1 H5	Start	182,294,825 bp
Band	1|1 H5	End	182,345,173 bp
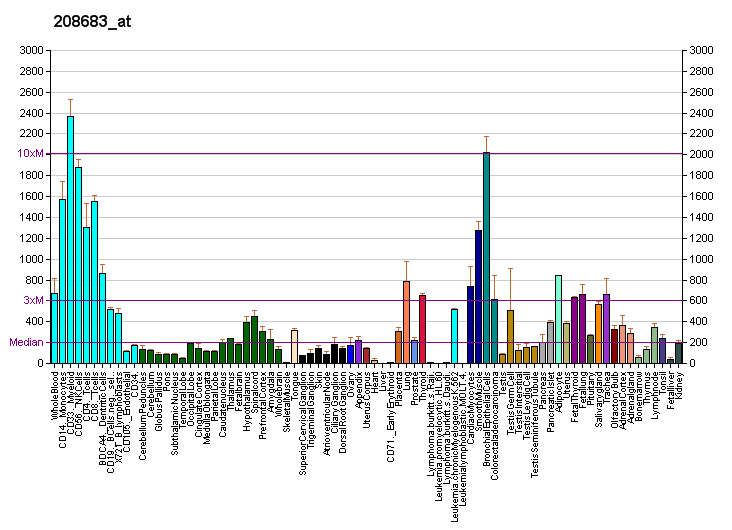
RNA expression pattern
Bgee	Human / Mouse (ortholog); Top expressed in: bronchial epithelial cell; nasal epithelium; glomerulus; mucosa of sigmoid colon; right uterine tube; parotid gland; metanephric glomerulus; parietal pleura; cartilage tissue; visceral pleura / Top expressed in: endothelial cell of lymphatic vessel; genital tubercle; facial motor nucleus; gastrula; umbilical cord; left lung; tail of embryo; right lung; right lung lobe; cornea; More reference expression data
BioGPS	More reference expression data
Gene ontology
Molecular function	calcium ion binding; cysteine-type peptidase activity; metal ion binding; cytoskeletal protein binding; peptidase activity; protein binding; protein heterodimerization activity; hydrolase activity; calcium-dependent cysteine-type endopeptidase activity; enzyme binding
Cellular component	Golgi apparatus; pseudopodium; membrane; focal adhesion; perinuclear endoplasmic reticulum; intracellular anatomical structure; dendrite; endoplasmic reticulum; cortical actin cytoskeleton; membrane raft; chromatin; lysosome; extracellular exosome; nucleus; cytosol; cytoplasm; plasma membrane; mitochondrial intermembrane space; external side of plasma membrane; cell projection; soma
Biological process	response to hypoxia; protein autoprocessing; proteolysis; cellular response to amino acid stimulus; myoblast fusion; proteolysis involved in cellular protein catabolic process; regulation of cytoskeleton organization; blastocyst development; extracellular matrix disassembly; female pregnancy; positive regulation of cardiac muscle cell apoptotic process; regulation of interleukin-6 production; cellular response to interferon-beta; response to hydrogen peroxide; behavioral response to pain; cellular response to lipopolysaccharide; positive regulation of neuron death; positive regulation of myoblast fusion; positive regulation of phosphatidylcholine biosynthetic process
Sources:Amigo / QuickGO
Orthologs
Databases	NCBI: entry; OMA: entry
Species	Human	Mouse
Entrez	824	12334
Ensembl	ENSG00000162909	ENSMUSG00000026509
UniProt	P17655	O08529
RefSeq (mRNA)	NM_001146068; NM_001748	NM_009794
RefSeq (protein)	NP_001139540; NP_001739	NP_033924
Location (UCSC)	Chr 1: 223.7 – 223.78 Mb	Chr 1: 182.29 – 182.35 Mb
PubMed search
- Wikidata
View/Edit Human	View/Edit Mouse

Calpain-2 catalytic subunit is a protein that in humans is encoded by the CAPN2 gene.

== Function ==
The calpains, calcium-activated neutral proteases, are nonlysosomal, intracellular cysteine proteases. The mammalian calpains include ubiquitous, stomach-specific, and muscle-specific proteins. The ubiquitous enzymes consist of heterodimers with distinct large, catalytic subunits associated with a common small, regulatory subunit. This gene encodes the large subunit of the ubiquitous enzyme, calpain 2. Multiple heterogeneous transcriptional start sites in the 5' UTR have been reported.

== Interactions ==
CAPN2 has been shown to interact with Bcl-2.
