= Calpain-10 =

Protein found in humans

CAPN10

Identifiers
- Aliases: CAPN10, CANP10, NIDDM1, calpain 10
- External IDs: OMIM: 605286; MGI: 1344392; GeneCards: CAPN10

Gene location (Human)
Chr.	Chromosome 2 (human)
Band	2q37.3	Start	240,586,734 bp
Band	2q37.3	End	240,617,705 bp

Gene location (Mouse)
Chr.	Chromosome 1 (mouse)
Band	1|1 D	Start	92,862,098 bp
Band	1|1 D	End	92,875,663 bp
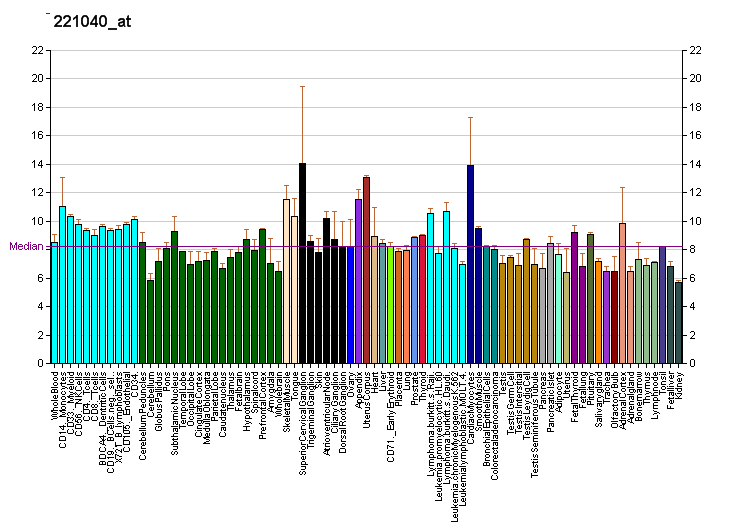

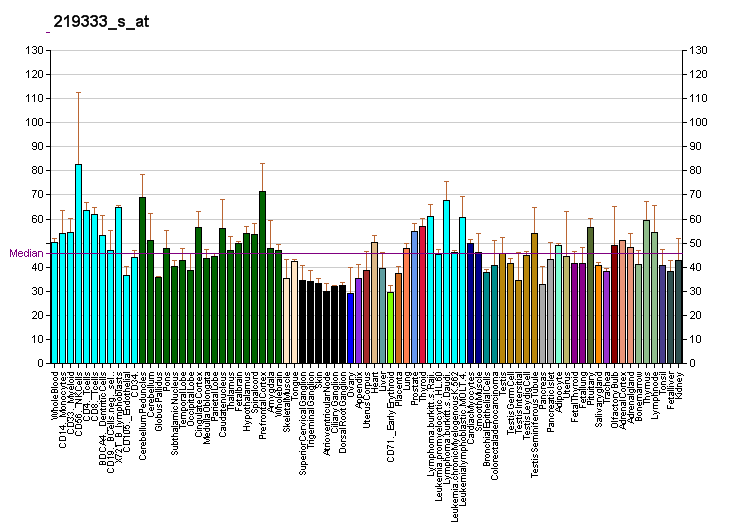
RNA expression pattern
Bgee	Human / Mouse (ortholog); Top expressed in: apex of heart; right hemisphere of cerebellum; granulocyte; spleen; anterior pituitary; right uterine tube; right frontal lobe; tibial nerve; left testis; right testis / Top expressed in: spermatocyte; otic vesicle; neural layer of retina; yolk sac; dentate gyrus of hippocampal formation granule cell; lip; saccule; right kidney; ventricular zone; seminiferous tubule; More reference expression data
BioGPS	More reference expression data
Gene ontology
Molecular function	cytoskeletal protein binding; peptidase activity; cysteine-type peptidase activity; hydrolase activity; SNARE binding; calcium-dependent cysteine-type endopeptidase activity
Cellular component	intracellular anatomical structure; cytosol; plasma membrane; mitochondrion; cytoplasm
Biological process	actin cytoskeleton reorganization; positive regulation of glucose import; cellular component disassembly involved in execution phase of apoptosis; positive regulation of intracellular transport; positive regulation of type B pancreatic cell apoptotic process; proteolysis; positive regulation of insulin secretion; cellular response to insulin stimulus; type B pancreatic cell apoptotic process
Sources:Amigo / QuickGO
Orthologs
Databases	NCBI: entry; OMA: entry
Species	Human	Mouse
Entrez	11132	23830
Ensembl	ENSG00000142330	ENSMUSG00000026270
UniProt	Q9HC96	Q9ESK3
RefSeq (mRNA)	NM_023089; NM_021251; NM_023083; NM_023084; NM_023085 NM_023086; NM_023087; NM_023088	NM_011796
RefSeq (protein)	NP_075571; NP_075573	NP_035926
Location (UCSC)	Chr 2: 240.59 – 240.62 Mb	Chr 1: 92.86 – 92.88 Mb
PubMed search
- Wikidata
View/Edit Human	View/Edit Mouse

Calpain-10 is a protein that in humans is encoded by the CAPN10 gene.

== Overview ==
Calpains are ubiquitous, well-conserved family of calcium-dependent, cysteine proteases. The typical calpain proteins are heterodimers consisting of an invariant small subunit and variable large subunits. The large catalytic subunit has four domains: domain I, the N-terminal regulatory domain that is processed upon calpain activation; domain II, the protease domain; domain III, a linker domain of unknown function; and domain IV, the calmodulin-like calcium-binding domain. The heterodimer interface is predominantly found between domain IV and the small subunit, which is also a calmodulin-like calcium-binding domain. This gene encodes a large subunit. It is an atypical calpain in that it lacks the calmodulin-like calcium-binding domain and instead has a divergent C-terminal domain. It therefore cannot heterodimerize with the small subunit. It is similar in organization to calpains 5 and 6. This gene is associated with type 2 or non-insulin-dependent diabetes mellitus (NIDDM) and located within the NIDDM1 region. Multiple alternative transcript variants encoding different isoforms have been described for this gene.
