= Calpain-9 =

Protein found in humans

CAPN9
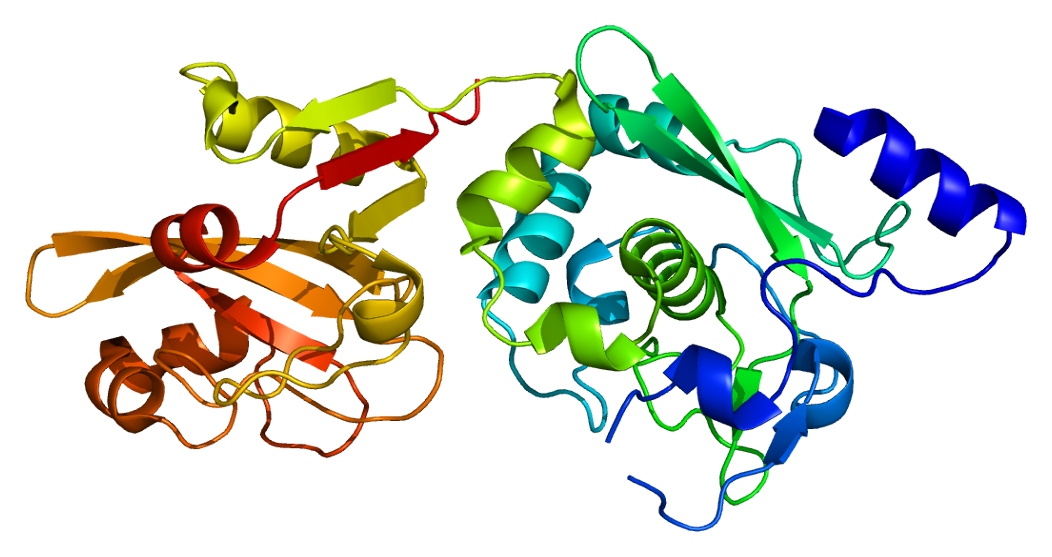

Identifiers
- Aliases: CAPN9, GC36, nCL-4, calpain 9
- External IDs: OMIM: 606401; MGI: 1920897; GeneCards: CAPN9
Available structures
PDB	Ortholog search: PDBe RCSB
PDB	List of PDB id codes 1ZIV, 2P0R

Gene location (Human)
Chr.	Chromosome 1 (human)
Band	1q42.2	Start	230,747,384 bp
Band	1q42.2	End	230,802,003 bp

Gene location (Mouse)
Chr.	Chromosome 8 (mouse)
Band	8|8 E2	Start	125,302,850 bp
Band	8|8 E2	End	125,345,470 bp
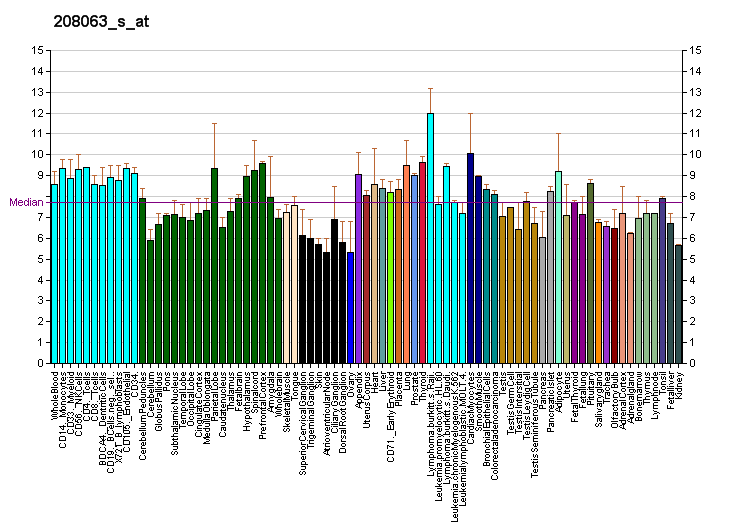

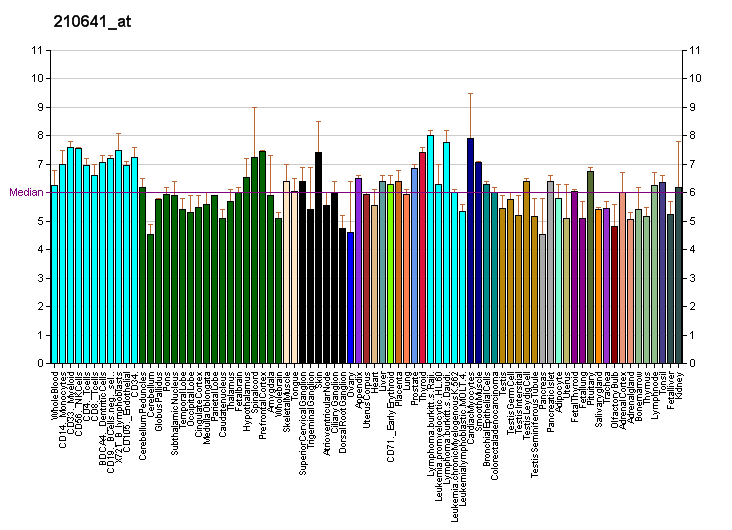
RNA expression pattern
Bgee	Human / Mouse (ortholog); Top expressed in: C1 segment; rectum; mucosa of transverse colon; body of stomach; gastric mucosa; mucosa of ileum; olfactory zone of nasal mucosa; bronchial epithelial cell; pancreatic ductal cell; right lung / Top expressed in: pyloric antrum; epithelium of stomach; mucous cell of stomach; lumbar spinal ganglion; embryo; duodenum; left colon; jejunum; intestinal villus; morula; More reference expression data
BioGPS	More reference expression data
Gene ontology
Molecular function	calcium ion binding; peptidase activity; cysteine-type peptidase activity; hydrolase activity; metal ion binding; calcium-dependent cysteine-type endopeptidase activity
Cellular component	intracellular anatomical structure; cytoplasm; cellular component
Biological process	digestion; proteolysis; sarcomere organization
Sources:Amigo / QuickGO
Orthologs
Databases	NCBI: entry; OMA: entry
Species	Human	Mouse
Entrez	10753	73647
Ensembl	ENSG00000135773	ENSMUSG00000031981
UniProt	O14815	Q9D805
RefSeq (mRNA)	NM_006615; NM_016452; NM_001319676	NM_023709
RefSeq (protein)	NP_001306605; NP_006606; NP_057536	NP_076198
Location (UCSC)	Chr 1: 230.75 – 230.8 Mb	Chr 8: 125.3 – 125.35 Mb
PubMed search
- Wikidata
View/Edit Human	View/Edit Mouse

Calpain-9 is a protein that in humans is encoded by the CAPN9 gene.

Calpains are ubiquitous, well-conserved family of calcium-dependent, cysteine proteases. The calpain proteins are heterodimers consisting of an invariant small subunit and variable large subunits. The large subunit possesses a cysteine protease domain, and both subunits possess calcium-binding domains. Calpains have been implicated in neurodegenerative processes, as their activation can be triggered by calcium influx and oxidative stress. The protein encoded by this gene is expressed predominantly in stomach and small intestine and may have specialized functions in the digestive tract. This gene is thought to be associated with gastric cancer. Multiple alternatively spliced transcript variants encoding different isoforms have been found for this gene.
