= EDANS =

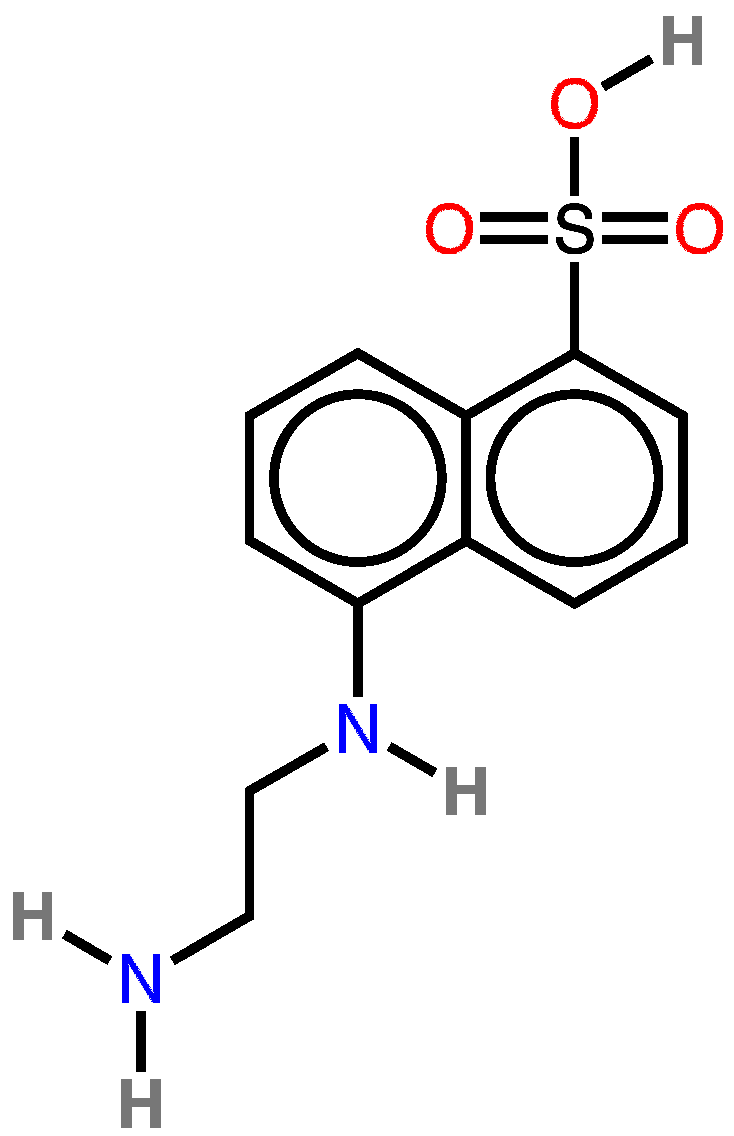

Names
- Preferred IUPAC name 5-[(2-Aminoethyl)amino]naphthalene-1-sulfonic acid
- Other names EDANS

Identifiers
CAS Number	50402-56-7
3D model (JSmol)	Interactive image
ChemSpider	83355
ECHA InfoCard	100.051.415
PubChem CID	92329
UNII	3JBY896YZF
CompTox Dashboard (EPA)	DTXSID70964660
- InChI: InChI=1S/C12H14N2O3S/c13-7-8-14-11-5-1-4-10-9(11)3-2-6-12(10)18(15,16)17/h1-6,14H,7-8,13H2,(H,15,16,17) Key: SJQRQOKXQKVJGJ-UHFFFAOYSA-N; InChI=1/C12H14N2O3S/c13-7-8-14-11-5-1-4-10-9(11)3-2-6-12(10)18(15,16)17/h1-6,14H,7-8,13H2,(H,15,16,17) Key: SJQRQOKXQKVJGJ-UHFFFAOYAN
- SMILES: c1cc2c(cccc2S(=O)(=O)O)c(c1)NCCN

Properties
Chemical formula	C_{12}H_{14}N_{2}O_{3}S
Molar mass	266.32
- Except where otherwise noted, data are given for materials in their standard state (at 25 °C [77 °F], 100 kPa). verify (what is ?) Infobox references

EDANS (5-((2-Aminoethyl)amino)naphthalene-1-sulfonic acid) is a donor for FRET-based nucleic acid probes and protease substrates. EDANS is often paired with DABCYL or DABSYL. The combination can be used in enzyme assays. When the two compounds are in close proximity, most of the energy emitted from EDANS will be quenched by DABCYL. However, if the compounds are separated (for example, by substrate cleavage) EDANS will fluoresce, giving an indication of enzyme presence.

== See also ==
- Dark quencher
