= Uncombable hair syndrome =

Rare scalp hair shaft dysplasia

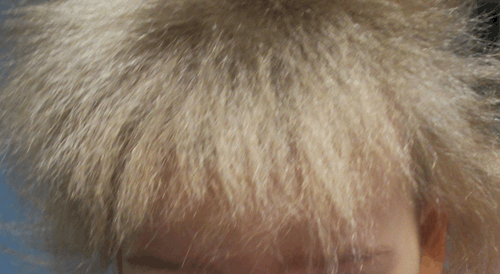
- Hair of a person with uncombable hair syndrome
- Specialty: Medical genetics
- Usual onset: Symptoms would be apparent between 3 months – 12 years
- Duration: Lifelong or until puberty
- Differential diagnosis: Woolly hair, pili torti, pili annulati, trichorrhexis invaginata, trichorrhexis nodosa
- Frequency: Rare, precise prevalence unknown

Uncombable hair syndrome (UHS) is a rare structural anomaly of the hair with a variable degree of effect. It is characterized by hair that is silvery, dry, frizzy, wiry, and impossible to comb. It was first reported in the early 20th century. UHS has several names, including pili trianguli et canaliculi (Latin), cheveux incoiffables (French), and "spun-glass hair".

This disorder is believed to be autosomal recessive in most instances, but there are a few documented cases where multiple family members display the trait in an autosomal dominant fashion. Based on the current scientific studies related to the disorder, the three genes that have been causally linked to UHS are PADI3, TGM3, and TCHH. These genes encode proteins important for hair shaft formation.

Clinical symptoms of the disorder typically arise between 3 months and 12 years of age. The quantity of hair on the head does not change, but hair starts to grow more slowly and becomes increasingly "uncombable". To be clinically apparent, 50% of all scalp hair shafts must be affected by UHS. This syndrome only affects the hair shaft of the scalp and does not influence hair growth in terms of quantity, textural feel, or appearance on the rest of the body.

== Presentation ==
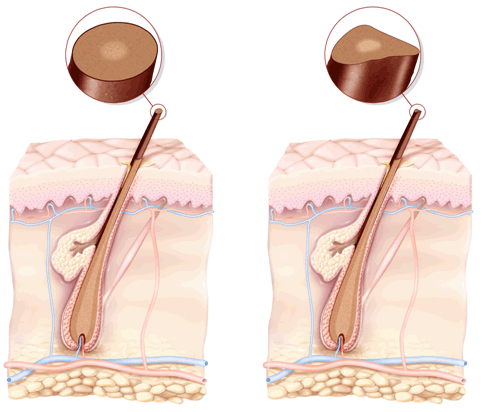
The shaft of normal hair (left) and hair in uncombable hair syndrome (right).

The hair is normal in quantity and is usually silvery-blond or straw-colored. It is disorderly, stands out from the scalp, and cannot be combed flat, but it can be controlled by braiding methods. This is caused by mutations in one of three possible genes; PADI3, TGM, or TCHH. These genes code for proteins involved in hair shaft formation and improvement often occurs in later childhood. Uncombable hair syndrome is mainly autosomal recessive, but it can also be autosomal dominant because there are other involved genes that have yet to be identified.

By early adulthood, phenotypic symptoms of UHS spontaneously improve or disappear. The hair of people with UHS may eventually lie flat and appear near normal in texture by adolescence or early adulthood for unknown reasons. Basmanav et al. have suggested that either different, non-mutated isoforms of the hair-forming enzymes are produced as we age, or that aging-related mechanistic changes in hair such as greater diameter and length help resolve UHS.

=== Symptoms ===
- Coarse hair
- Trichodysplasia
- White hair
- Woolly hair
- Patchy baldness

== Cause ==
As one would expect from the name, individuals affected by this disorder have difficulty managing and grooming their hair. Affected individuals usually possess blonde or silver hair that may be present at birth or develop over time. The hair is wiry, frizzy, and stands straight out from the scalp. It is often dry but not fragile or brittle. This is due to several structural abnormalities in the hair shaft. A cross-section of the hair shaft from affected individuals reveals a kidney bean, triangular, or oval diameter, unlike the circular shaft shape displayed in straight hair. This irregularity in the diameter of the hair shaft prevents the hair from lying neatly against adjacent hair fibers. Trichohyalin (TCHH) is a structural protein responsible for the proper cylindrical fiber topology of the hair shaft. TCHH binds other TCHH and keratin-intermediate filaments creating the proper cross-links and cylindrical shape of the hair shaft. PADI3 and TGM3 are two enzymes responsible for post-translational modification of TCHH important for cross-linking of TCHH within the hair. In Uncombable Hair Syndrome mutations in TCHH, PADI3, or TGM3 result in improper cross-linking and the resulting irregular shape of the hair shaft.

The particular defect in TCHH as a structural component of hair may be a defect of deimination. Deimination converts the amino acid arginine to the amino acid citrulline. This conversion is done by calcium-dependent enzymes known as peptidylarginine deiminases (PADs). PADI3 is a member of this enzyme class. One study reported PAD involvement in skin and skin-related diseases, particularly at the hair follicle. Alterations to PAD activity resulted in the development of Uncombable Hair Syndrome. Another study examined the transglutaminase (TG) family of enzymes and their involvement in UHS. This family of enzymes includes TGM3, which is expressed in epidermal cells. Mutations in TGM3 may therefore reduce or alter the intermolecular cross-linking important for hair shaft formation, leading to Uncombable Hair Syndrome.

Another molecular mechanism of UHS was proposed by Ralph Trueb in 2003. He suggested that premature keratinization of the inner hair root forms a rigid sheath that alters the shape of a hair strand as it grows out of the root.

=== TCHH ===
Uncombable hair syndrome 1 is caused by a defect in the trichohyalin gene (TCHH) found in hair follicles and some parts of hair strands. It serves as a scaffold protein, with involucrin, in cell envelope organization. The trichohyalin gene is produced and changed by other proteins and to molecules such as keratin intermediate filaments to form organized cross-links. These networks provide the hair shaft with its cylindrical form. This, in turn, leads to frizzy hair, resulting in uncombable hair. The chromosomal location for this TCHH gene is located on chromosome 1. The condition usually improves over time, and will have better hair structure once it reaches adolescence.

It is still being decided whether TCHH is autosomal dominant, or autosomal recessive. In an experiment, they identified the causative mutations of UHS in 3 genes; PADI3, TGM3, and TCHH in 11 children. These children carried homozygous/heterozygous mutations in those 3 genes, which resulted in autosomal recessive inheritance. Because it was identified as autosomal recessive inheritance, scanning electron microscopy was performed in order to rule out autosomal dominance since this type of gene can also be autosomal dominant to a certain extent.

=== TGM3 ===
Uncombable hair syndrome 2 is caused by a defect in transglutaminase 3 (TGM3) gene. This gene helps provide instructions for creating an enzyme known as transglutaminase 3. This gene is found in skin cells known as keratinocytes and corneocytes. This helps frame the scalp, root, and strands of hair. It helps the molecules bind to other proteins. The cross-links help provide strength and structure to the cells' skin and hair cells. Chromosomal location of Transglutaminase 3 is located on chromosome 20.

An experiment was done where Transglutaminase 3 reduced in esophageal cancer. They used western blot analysis and polymerase chain reaction. With the 58 pairs of tissues that were sampled, it was confirmed that transglutaminase 3 is closely related to growth proliferation and migration. However, the over-expression of this gene induces cell proliferation, migration, and invasion, and promotes programmed cell death. This came to show that transglutaminase 3 will be a candidate growth and could function as a helpful biomarker and a therapeutic target to esophageal cancer treatment.

=== PADI3 ===
Uncombable hair syndrome 3 is caused by a defect in the PADI3 gene (peptidylarginine-deiminase 3) and is located on chromosome 1. This defect apparently is the most common cause of UHS. The PADI3 gene provides instructions for creating an enzyme called peptidylargine deiminase 3. PADI3 is found within the skin's extreme external surface, inside cells called karinocytes. The protein also contributes to hair follicles that are specialized structures within the skin where development happens. In these hair follicles, the PADI3 gene adjusts proteins that are giving structure to the hair strand. The PADI3 gene also involves a process called deimination. This process modifies the protein's intuitive with other proteins.

An experiment was performed in where the PADI3 is found in central centrifugal cicatricial alopecia which is mostly found in African women that suggests an autosomal dominant trait to occur. With this experiment, they performed a process called immunoblotting and immunofluorescence. With immunoblotting, it appeared that the transfected cells had a marginally lower expression of the mutant compared to the wild-type. With immunofluorescence it resulted in an irregular intracellular location of the protein. Therefore, it helped conclude that there was a reduction in enzymatic action that encodes a protein to hair shaft arrangement, which relates to central centrifugal cicatricial alopecia (CCCA).

== Diagnosis ==
=== Differential diagnosis ===
Other syndromes with hair abnormalities may also show features of uncombable hair syndrome such as Rapp–Hodgkin ectodermal dysplasia syndrome, loose anagen syndrome, EEC syndrome (ectodermal dysplasia, ectrodactyly and cleft lip/palate) and familial tricho-odonto-onychial ectodermal dysplasia with syndactyly. However, unlike these conditions, uncombable hair syndrome alone is not associated with physical, neurologic, or mental abnormalities.

According to the U.S. National Institute of Health, the condition tends to develop in childhood (age 3–12) and resolve by adolescence.

Another observation that can be made when detecting uncombable hair syndrome in individuals is by observing the hair shaft under a special microscope. When individual hair strands are being viewed, the hair is triangular or kidney-shaped and has a longitudinal groove on one or two faces.

Clinical diagnosis of UHS can be confirmed molecularly by performing high-resolution microscopy on hair shafts using scanning electron microscopy (SEM). SEM allows for the visualization of hair shaft cross-sections, which can appear triangular, heart-shaped, kidney-shaped, flat, or longitudinally grooved. Interestingly, multiple different cross sections can appear on a single shaft of hair. An alternative method for confirming a UHS diagnosis molecularly is by embedding UHS hairs into paraffin. Due to the atypical shape of the hair shafts in UHS, UHS hair will refract light differently than typical hair, causing a glistening effect.

== Treatment ==
Although it tends to regress naturally later in childhood, there is no definitive treatment for Uncombable Hair Syndrome. The only recommended treatment is using soft brushes and gentle conditioners. It is also recommended to avoid hair treatments that can be harsh on hair (excessive brushing, blow drying, perms, or coloring hair). Biotin supplements have also been used as a treatment, due to their historical utility in controlling nail fragility and improving hair growth after 4 months of supplementation.

== Epidemiology ==
While UHS is thought to be extremely rare, its precise frequency and prevalence is unknown. As of 2016, there were about 100 case studies of UHS in the scientific literature, and as of 2020, there are a few more documented case studies.

UHS has been found in patients who also have diseases such as ectodermal dysplasia and loose anagen hair syndrome. While sometimes observed with other disorders, it is believed that uncombable hair syndrome is an isolated disease.

== History ==
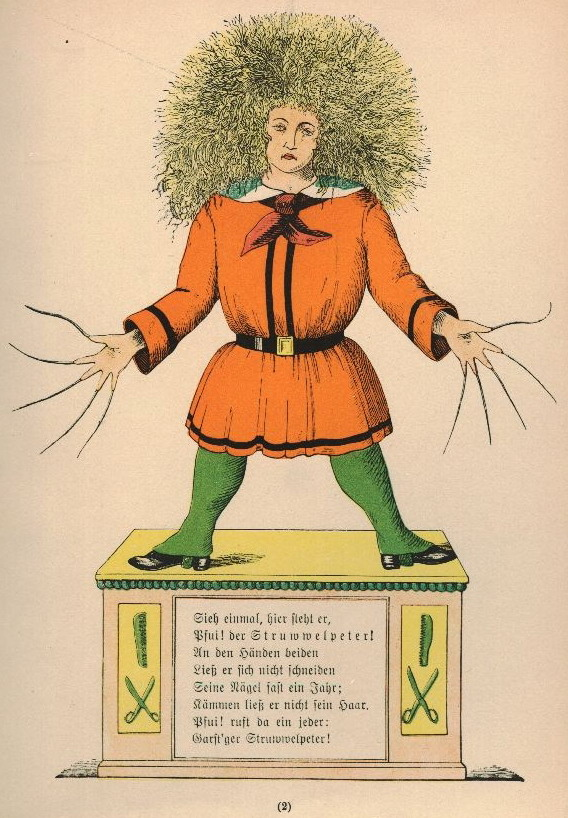
Heinrich Hoffmann's "Struwwelpeter"

The syndrome's name it comes directly from its abnormal, frizzy appearance that "totally resists any effort to control it with brush or comb". A possible case of uncombable hair syndrome was reported in 1912 by A. F. Le Double and F. Houssay. The syndrome was described in 1973 by A. Dupré, P. Rochiccioli, and J. L. Bonafé, who named it cheveux incoiffables (unstyleable hair). Later that year it was independently described as "spun-glass hair" by J. D. Stroud and A. H. Mehregan. The currently used term was coined in the early 1980s. However, the UHS phenotype was recorded well before the first literature report in 1973. A children’s story published in Germany in 1845 detailed a character named Struwwelpeter or "Shockheaded Peter", presumably to describe the frizzy nature of a patient's hair with UHS. This children's story was later translated by Mark Twain and the character was instead called "Slovenly Peter".

Evidence of familial transmission of UHS prior to 1973 also comes from case studies. In 1983, Garty et al. described the case of a 2-year-old boy whose father, grandfather, and great-grandfather were all said to have the same condition at a young age—difficulty combing their hair. In 1993, Zanca and Zanca found a book from 1912 that details the observations, made by Le Double and Houssay (in their book Les Velus), of people with "mop hair" that does not tolerate combing.

Some scientists speculate uncombable hair syndrome to be the cause of Albert Einstein's iconic hairstyle.

== See also ==
- List of cutaneous conditions
