= Epidermal differentiation complex =

Gene complex

The epidermal differentiation complex (EDC) is a gene complex comprising over fifty genes encoding proteins involved in the terminal differentiation and cornification of keratinocytes, the primary cell type of the epidermis. In humans, the complex is located on a 1.9 Mbp stretch within chromosome 1q21. The proteins encoded by EDC genes are closely related in terms of function, and evolutionarily they belong to three distinct gene families: the cornified envelope precursor family, the S100 protein family and the S100 fused type protein (SFTP) family.

It has been hypothesized that the clustering of EDC genes occurred due to duplication events which were evolutionarily favored during the adaptation to terrestrial environments. In sirenians, the main subtypes of EDC genes have been conserved or even duplicated, such as the duplicated late cornified envelope genes of dugongs. On the other hand, FLG genes (filaggrin) of the SFTP family have become inactivated in sirenians, with the exception of manatees. Cetaceans have also lost function of FLG genes. EDC proteins have been involved in a variety of skin disorders including ichthyosis vulgaris, atopic dermatitis and psoriasis.

== History ==
The epidermal differentiation complex was first described in 1993, and further characterized in 1996, when Dietmar Mischke and colleagues noted the "close functional cooperation among [eleven] structurally and evolutionary related genes". By 2001, 37 genes had been identified as members of the EDC. The number rose to 43 in 2002, and by 2012 a total of 57 genes were considered part of the complex.

== EDC genes ==
=== Cornified envelope precursor family ===
As its name implies, the cornified envelope (CE) precursor family includes genes that encode the proteins forming the CE. The CE is a cross-linked matrix that surrounds terminally differentiated squamous keratinocytes after a process known as cornification. CE precursor proteins are cross-linked by transglutaminases. The ratio of CE precursor proteins varies from tissue to tissue. In the epidermis, the most abundant CE component is loricrin (65-70%), while involucrin is a minor component (<5%). The other CE proteins are classified as small proline-rich (SPRR) proteins, a subset of which is the late cornified envelope (LCE) protein group.

- involucrin (IVL)
- loricrin (LOR)

==== Small proline-rich proteins (SPRR proteins) ====
- SPRR1A (cornifin A)
- SPRR1B (cornifin B)
- SPRR2A
- SPRR2B
- SPRR2C
- SPRR2D
- SPRR2E
- SPRR2F
- SPRR2G
- SPRR3
- SPRR4

==== Late cornified envelope proteins (LCE proteins) ====
- LCE1A
- LCE1B
- LCE1C
- LCE1D
- LCE1E
- LCE1F
- LCE2A
- LCE2B
- LCE2C
- LCE2D
- LCE3A
- LCE3B
- LCE3C
- LCE3D
- LCE3E
- LCE4A
- LCE5A
- LCE6A
- C1orf68

=== S100 family ===
The S100 family comprises 17 genes and 6 pseudogenes. S100 proteins contain two EF-hand motifs separated by a hinge region. S100 proteins have various functions and are generally associated with abnormal epidermal differentiation. S100A8 and S100A9 (calgranulin A and B, respectively), dimerize to form calprotectin. Calprotectin, psoriasin (S100A7) and koebnerisin (S100A7A) are antimicrobial peptides.

- S100A1
- S100A2
- S100A3
- S100A4
- S100A5
- S100A6
- S100A7 (psoriasin)
- S100A7A (koebnerisin)
- S100A7L2
- S100A8 (calgranulin A)
- S100A9 (calgranulin B)
- S100A10
- S100A11
- S100A12 (calgranulin C)
- S100A13
- S100A14
- S100A16

=== SFTP family ===
The S100 fused type protein (SFTP) family or fused gene family encompasses genes which are mainly expressed in stratified epithelia and play a role in epithelial homeostasis. Like S100 proteins, SFTPs contain two calcium-binding EF-hand motifs. These proteins are associated with cytoplasmic intermediate filaments as well as minor components of the CE. Due to their homologous structure they are also known as filaggrin-like proteins.

- filaggrin (FLG)
- filaggrin-2 (FLG2)
- trichohyalin (TCHH)
- trichohyalin-like 1 (TCHHL1)
- cornulin (CRNN)
- repetin (RPTN)
- hornerin (HRNR)

== Regulation of EDC gene expression ==
EDC genes are transcriptionally controlled by various transcription factors such as krüppel-like factor 4 (KLF4), GATA3, grainyhead-like 3 (GRHL3), aryl hydrocarbon receptor nuclear translocator (ARNT) and NRF2.
