= Citrullinated protein =

Citrullinated protein may refer to:

- Any protein having undergone citrullination
- The proteins (often cyclic ones) being the targets of anti-citrullinated protein antibodies
