= Citrullination =

Biological process

The chemical conversion of arginine to citrulline, known as citrullination or deimination.

Citrullination or deimination is the conversion of the amino acid arginine in a protein into the amino acid citrulline. Citrulline is not one of the 20 standard amino acids encoded by DNA in the genetic code. Instead, it is the result of a post-translational modification. Citrullination is distinct from the formation of the free amino acid citrulline as part of the urea cycle or as a byproduct of enzymes of the nitric oxide synthase family.

Enzymes called arginine deiminases catalyze the deimination of free arginine, while protein arginine deiminases or peptidylarginine deiminases (PADs) replace the primary ketimine group by a ketone group. Arginine is positively charged at a neutral pH, whereas citrulline has no net charge. This increases the hydrophobicity of the protein, which can lead to changes in protein folding, affecting the structure and function.

The immune system can attack citrullinated proteins, leading to autoimmune diseases such as rheumatoid arthritis and multiple sclerosis. Fibrin and fibrinogen may be favored sites for arginine deimination within rheumatoid joints. Test for presence of anti-citrullinated protein antibodies are highly specific (88–96%) for rheumatoid arthritis, about as sensitive as rheumatoid factor (70–78%) for diagnosis of RA, and are detectable from even before the onset of clinical disease.

Citrullinated vimentin may be an autoantigen in rheumatoid arthritis and other autoimmune diseases, and is used to study rheumatoid arthritis. Moreover, antibodies against mutated citrullinated vimentin may be useful for monitoring effects of rheumatoid arthritis therapy. An ELISA system utilises genetically modified citrullinated vimentin, a naturally occurring isoform of vimentin to improve the performance of the test.

In the reaction from arginine to citrulline, one of the terminal nitrogen atoms of the arginine side chain is replaced by an oxygen. Thus, arginine's positive charge (at physiological pH) is removed, altering the protein's tertiary structure. The reaction uses one water molecule and yields ammonia as a side-product:

== PAD subtypes ==
PADs are found in chordates but not in lower animals. In mammals five PAD isotypes – PAD1, PAD2, PAD3, PAD4 and PAD6 – have been found. PAD5 was thought to be a unique isotype in humans, however it was shown to be homologous to PAD4. These isotypes differ in terms of their tissue and cellular distributions.

PAD1 expression has been detected in epidermis and the uterus, and it acts in citrullination of keratin and filaggrin, key components of keratinocytes.

PAD2 is expressed at a high level in the central nervous system, including the eye and brain, as well as skeletal muscle and the spleen. PAD transcripts have been found in the C57BL6/J mouse eyes as early as embryonic day 14.5. PAD2 has also been shown to interact with vimentin in skeletal muscle and macrophages, causing the filaments to disassemble, suggesting a role in apoptosis.

One of PAD2's target substrates is myelin basic protein. In the normal retina, deimination is found in nearly all the retinal layers, including the photoreceptors. Deimination has been also reported in neuronal cells, such as astrocytes, microglia and oligodendrocytes, Schwann cells and neurons. Methylation and phosphorylation of myelin basic protein are active during the process of myelinogenesis. In early development of the central nervous system of the embryo, deimination of myelin basic protein plays a major role in myelin assembly. In adults, deimination myelin basic protein occurs in demyelinating diseases such as multiple sclerosis. Myelin basic protein may affect different cell types in each case.

PAD3 expression has been linked to sheep wool modification. Citrullination of trichohyalin allows it to bind and cross-link keratin filaments, directing growth of the wool fiber.

PAD4 regulates gene expression through histone modifications. DNA is wrapped around histones, and the histone proteins can control DNA expression when chemical groups are added and removed. This process is known as post-translational processing or post-translational modification, because it takes place on the protein after the DNA is translated. The role of post-translational processing in gene regulation is the subject of the growing field of study, epigenetics. One modification mechanism is methylation. A methyl group binds to an arginine on the histone protein, altering DNA binding to the histone and allowing transcription to take place. When PAD converts arginine to citrulline on a histone, it blocks further methylation of the histone, inhibiting transcription. The main isotype for this is PAD4, which deiminates arginines and/or monomethylated arginines on histones 3 and 4, turning off the effects of arginine methylation.

== Autoimmune diseases ==
In rheumatoid arthritis and other autoimmune diseases, such as psoriatic arthritis, systemic lupus erythematosus and Sjögren's syndrome, autoantibodies often attack citrullinated proteins. The presence of anti-citrullinated protein antibody is a standard test for rheumatoid arthritis, and it is associated with more severe disease. Citrullinated proteins are also found in the cellular debris accompanying the destruction of cells in Alzheimer's disease, and after smoking cigarettes. So citrullination seems to be part of the mechanism that stimulates the immune system in autoimmune disease. However, citrullinated proteins can also be found in healthy colon mucosa.

== Detection of citrullinated peptides and proteins ==
Citrullinated peptides and proteins can be detected using antibodies targeting the citrullinated residues, or detected using mass spectrometry-based proteomics technologies. Citrullination of arginine results in a monoisotopic mass increase of +0.984016 Da, which can be measured with mass spectrometry. The mass shift is close to the mass difference between the different peptide isotopes of +1.008665 which can be mistaken for a citrullinated peptide, especially on low-resolution instruments. However, this is less of an issue with modern high resolution/high accuracy mass spectrometers. Furthermore, the mass shift is identical to the mass shift caused by deamidation of the amino acid asparagine or glutamine side chain, which are common modifications.

Citrulline residues can be chemically modified with butanedione or by biotinylation prior to analysis, leading to a different mass shift, and this strategy has successfully been used to facilitate identification by mass spectrometry.

Another approach is to utilize the neutral loss of isocyanic acid (HNCO) from citrulline residues when submitted to low energy collision induced dissociation fragmentation in mass spectrometers. The loss causes a mass shift of −43.0058 Da, which can be utilized by mass spectrometers to predominantly select citrullinated peptides for fragmentation (sequencing).

Finally, the loss of positive charge at physiological pH caused by citrullination can be utilized. Prior to bottom-up proteomics analysis, proteins are enzymatically cleaved into peptides. Commonly the protease trypsin is used, which cleaves after the positively charged arginine and lysine residues. However, trypsin is unable to cleave after a citrulline residue which is neutral. A missed cleavage after a citrulline residue together with the correct mass shift can be used as a specific and sensitive marker for citrullination, and the strategy is compatible with standard bottom-up proteomics workflows.

The first comprehensive textbook on deimination was published in 2014, while the second edition was published in 2017.
