= Lucid-MS =

Clinical data
- Other names: Lucid-21-302
- Routes of administration: Oral
- Drug class: Protein arginine deiminase 2 (PAD2) inhibitor
- ATC code: None

Pharmacokinetic data
- Elimination half-life: 1.5–2.5 hours

Lucid-MS, also known as Lucid-21-302, is a protein arginine deiminase 2 (PAD2) inhibitor which is under development for the treatment of multiple sclerosis. It is taken orally.

The drug is described as a non-immunomodulatory neuroprotective agent against demyelination and is said to be a potential first-in-class medication. The pharmacokinetics of Lucid-MS have been described.

It was originated by University Health Network and has been developed by FSD Pharma, Lucid Psycheceuticals, and Quantum Biopharma. As of February 2026, Lucid-MS is in phase 1 clinical trials, with at least one phase 1 trial having been completed and published. A phase 2 trial is being planned. The chemical structure of Lucid-MS does not yet appear to have been disclosed.

== See also ==
- Lucid-PSYCH
