= C27H31N5O3 =

The molecular formula C_{27}H_{31}N_{5}O_{3} may refer to:

- BIBP-3226
- GSK484
