= Trichohyalin =

Protein encoded by the TCHH gene in mammals

TCHH

Identifiers
- Aliases: TCHH, THH, THL, TRHY, trichohyalin, UHS3
- External IDs: OMIM: 190370; MGI: 2177944; GeneCards: TCHH

Gene location (Human)
Chr.	Chromosome 1 (human)
Band	1q21.3	Start	152,106,317 bp
Band	1q21.3	End	152,115,444 bp

Gene location (Mouse)
Chr.	Chromosome 3 (mouse)
Band	3|3 F2.1	Start	93,349,637 bp
Band	3|3 F2.1	End	93,356,384 bp
RNA expression pattern
Bgee	Human / Mouse (ortholog); Top expressed in: skin of arm; skin of hip; placenta; gonad; testicle; sural nerve; nipple; body of tongue; hair follicle; skin of thigh / Top expressed in: hair follicle; lip; skin of back; decidua; sexually immature organism; skin of external ear; vas deferens; skin of abdomen; proximal tubule; right kidney; More reference expression data
BioGPS	n/a
Gene ontology
Molecular function	metal ion binding; calcium ion binding; transition metal ion binding
Cellular component	cytoskeleton; cornified envelope; cytosol
Biological process	keratinization; cornification; biological process; intermediate filament organization
Sources:Amigo / QuickGO
Orthologs
Databases	NCBI: entry; OMA: entry
Species	Human	Mouse
Entrez	7062	99681
Ensembl	ENSG00000159450	ENSMUSG00000052415
UniProt	Q07283	A0A0B4J1F9
RefSeq (mRNA)	NM_007113	NM_001163098
RefSeq (protein)	NP_009044	NP_001156570
Location (UCSC)	Chr 1: 152.11 – 152.12 Mb	Chr 3: 93.35 – 93.36 Mb
PubMed search
- Wikidata
View/Edit Human	View/Edit Mouse

Trichohyalin is a protein that in mammals is encoded by the TCHH gene.

== Discovery ==
In 1903 the name trichohyalin was assigned to the granules of the inner root sheath (IRS) of hair follicles discovered by Hans Vörner. In 1986 the name was reassigned to a protein isolated from sheep wool follicles.

== Gene location ==
The human TCHH is located on the long (q) arm of chromosome 1 at region 2 band 1 sub-band 3 (1q21.3), from base pair 152,105,403 to base pair 152,116,368 (map). This region in chromosome 1q21 is known as the epidermal differentiation complex, since it harbors over fifty other genes involved in keratinocyte differentiation.

Gene coding sequence contains 5829 nucleotides. Gene orthologs were identified in most mammals including mice, chickens, rats, pigs, sheep, horses and other species.

== Protein localisation ==
Trichohyalin is highly expressed in the inner root sheath cells of the hair follicle and medulla. It was also detected in the granular layer and stratum corneum of normal epidermis, newborn human foreskin epidermis, the hard palate, in the nail matrix, the filiform papillae of dorsal tongue epithelium and in rodent forestomach.

== Function ==
The protein forms frequent links between the heads and tails of the keratin chains and, thus, participates in keratin intermediate filaments (KIF) inter-filamentous cross-linking. It also carries a function of a major reinforcement cross-bridging protein for the cell envelope (CE) barrier structure of the IRS and participates in coordination of CE structure.

Overall, trichohyalin confers mechanical strength to the hair follicle inner root sheath and to other toughened epithelial tissues.

== Structure ==
Trichohyalin belongs to the S100-fused protein family. It is a monomer, containing 1943 amino acids, and has elongated (>200 nm) single-stranded alpha-helical conformation based on its unusually high content of charged residues.

Molecular mass of the human trichohyalin is 253925 Da.

The protein includes nine domains. Domain 1 contains two EF-hand calcium-binding domains. Domains 2-4, 6, and 8 are almost entirely alpha-helical, configured as a series of peptide repeats of varying regularity, and are thought to form a single-stranded alpha-helical rod stabilised by ionic interactions. Domain 6 is the most regular and may bind KIF directly by ionic interactions. Domains 5 and 7 are less well organised and may induce folds in the molecule. Domain 9 contains the C-terminus, conserved among different species.

== Post-translational modifications ==
- Peptidylarginine deiminases (PAD) catalyse the deimination of arginine residues to citrullines.
- Cross-linking by transglutaminase (TGase) enzymes results in the formation of an isopeptide bond between peptide-bound glutamine and lysine residues and provide insolubility and the rigid structure to trichohyalin.

== Interactions ==
TCHH protein is extensively cross-linked to itself in the IRS tissue as well as to keratin intermediate filaments (KIF). All TCHH-keratin links involved only domain 6 or 8 sequences.

The protein can also form cross-links to all other CE proteins including involucrin, envoplakin, keratin, repetin, desmoplakin, SPR1, SPR2, and LEP.

TCHH-TCHH and TCHH-CE protein links are distributed among domains 2–5, but are uncommon in domains 6 and 8. Most intra-THH cross-links occurred in the least organised domain 5 region at a 3.5-fold higher frequency.

== Clinical significance ==
Trichohyalin is associated with uncombable hair syndrome, human alopecia areata and also may be linked to curly hair phenotype in Europeans.

A weak expression of the protein was discovered in the horny layer of psoriasis, ichthyosis, keratosis pilaris, porokeratosis, chronic dermatitis and callus. The same level of trichohyalin expression was found in epidermal tumours (seborrheic keratosis, actinic keratosis, Bowen's disease, well-differentiated squamous cell carcinoma) and follicular tumours (trichoepithelioma, keratotic basal cell epithelioma, proliferating trichilemmal tumour, trichilemmoma, pilomatricoma and keratoacanthoma).
