= PADI1 =

Protein found in humans

Identifiers
- Aliases: PADI1, HPAD10, PAD1, PDI, PDI1, peptidyl arginine deiminase 1
- External IDs: OMIM: 607934; MGI: 1338893; GeneCards: PADI1
Enzyme activity
EC #	BRENDA	ExPASy	KEGG	MetaCyc
3.5.3.15	↗	↗	↗	↗

Gene location (Human)
Chr.	Chromosome 1 (human)
Band	1p36.13	Start	17,205,128 bp
Band	1p36.13	End	17,246,007 bp

Gene location (Mouse)
Chr.	Chromosome 4 (mouse)
Band	4 D3|4 72.62 cM	Start	140,540,294 bp
Band	4 D3|4 72.62 cM	End	140,573,089 bp
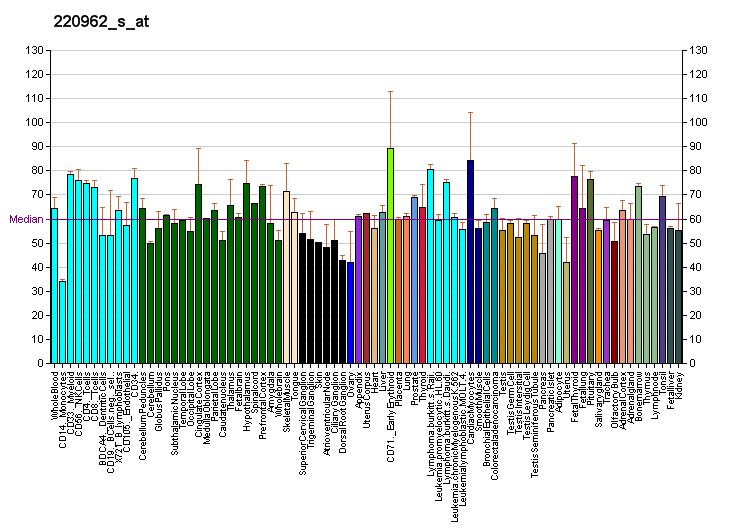
RNA expression pattern
Bgee	Human / Mouse (ortholog); Top expressed in: vagina; skin of leg; skin of abdomen; olfactory zone of nasal mucosa; placenta; tonsil; substantia nigra; minor salivary glands; mucosa of transverse colon; rectum / Top expressed in: cervix; lip; esophagus; hair follicle; conjunctival fornix; decidua; morula; skin of back; transitional epithelium of urinary bladder; trachea; More reference expression data
BioGPS	More reference expression data
Gene ontology
Molecular function	calcium ion binding; hydrolase activity; protein-arginine deiminase activity; metal ion binding
Cellular component	nucleus; nucleoplasm; cytoplasm; cytosol
Biological process	chromatin organization
Sources:Amigo / QuickGO
Orthologs
Databases	NCBI: entry; OMA: entry
Species	Human	Mouse
Entrez	29943	18599
Ensembl	ENSG00000142623; ENSG00000281459	ENSMUSG00000025329
UniProt	Q9ULC6	Q9Z185
RefSeq (mRNA)	NM_013358	NM_011059
RefSeq (protein)	NP_037490	NP_035189
Location (UCSC)	Chr 1: 17.21 – 17.25 Mb	Chr 4: 140.54 – 140.57 Mb
PubMed search
- Wikidata
View/Edit Human	View/Edit Mouse

Peptidyl arginine deiminase, type I, also known as PADI1, is a protein which in humans is encoded by the PADI1 gene.

This gene encodes a member of the peptidyl arginine deiminase family of enzymes, which catalyze the post-translational deimination of proteins by converting arginine residues into citrullines in the presence of calcium ions. The family members have distinct substrate specificities and tissue-specific expression patterns. The type I enzyme is involved in the late stages of epidermal differentiation, where it deiminates filaggrin and keratin K1, which maintains hydration of the stratum corneum, and hence the cutaneous barrier function. This enzyme may also play a role in hair follicle formation. This gene exists in a cluster with four other paralogous genes.
