= JTB =

JTB may refer to:

- Jets to Brazil, an American rock band
- Johannes Thingnes Bø (born 1993), Norwegian biathlete
- John the Baptist (died circa 30), Jewish preacher and ascetic
- JTB (gene), a human gene
- Journal of Theoretical Biology, a scientific journal
- JTB Corporation, formerly Japan Travel Bureau, the largest travel agency in Japan
- Justified true belief, a philosophical definition of knowledge
- JTB (software), a preprocessor that produces JavaCC files
- Joint IED Defeat (JIEDD) Test Board, an organization within the Joint Improvised Explosive Device Defeat Organization
- J. Turner Butler Boulevard, a major expressway in Jacksonville, Florida carrying the designation Florida State Road 202
