= JBI-589 =

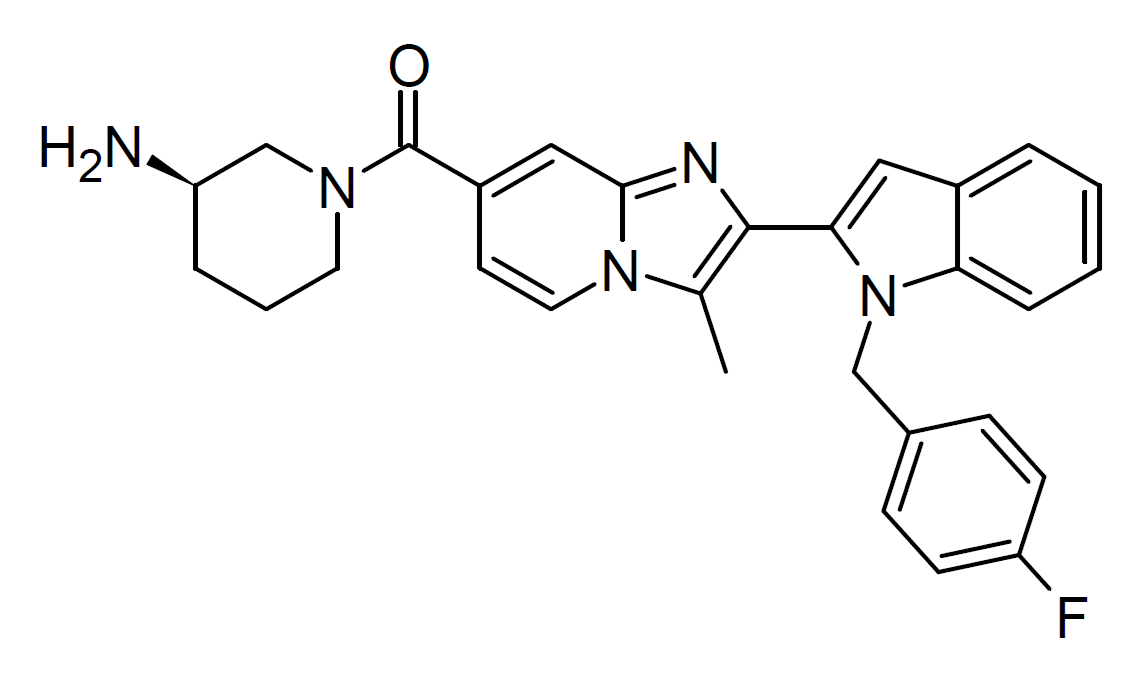

Identifiers
- IUPAC name: [(3R)-3-aminopiperidin-1-yl]-[2-[1-[(4-fluorophenyl)methyl]indol-2-yl]-3-methylimidazo[1,2-a]pyridin-7-yl]methanone
- CAS Number: 2308504-22-3
- PubChem CID: 138578805
- ChemSpider: 128942452
- ECHA InfoCard: 100.383.687

Chemical and physical data
- Formula: C_{29}H_{28}FN_{5}O
- Molar mass: 481.575 g·mol^{−1}
- 3D model (JSmol): Interactive image
- SMILES: CC1=C(N=C2N1C=CC(=C2)C(=O)N3CCC[C@H](C3)N)C4=CC5=CC=CC=C5N4CC6=CC=C(C=C6)F
- InChI: InChI=1S/C29H28FN5O/c1-19-28(32-27-16-22(12-14-34(19)27)29(36)33-13-4-6-24(31)18-33)26-15-21-5-2-3-7-25(21)35(26)17-20-8-10-23(30)11-9-20/h2-3,5,7-12,14-16,24H,4,6,13,17-18,31H2,1H3/t24-/m1/s1; Key:DUVCPNSLXBKGOK-XMMPIXPASA-N

JBI-589 is an experimental drug which acts as an orally active, selective inhibitor of the enzyme peptidylarginine deiminase 4 (PAD4). It has antiinflammatory effects and has been researched for potential use in the treatment of arthritis and some forms of cancer.

== See also ==
- AFM-30a
- BB-Cl-Amidine
- GSK484
