= PADI3 =

Protein found in humans

Identifiers
- Aliases: PADI3, PAD3, PDI3, peptidyl arginine deiminase 3, UHS1
- External IDs: OMIM: 606755; MGI: 1338891; GeneCards: PADI3
Enzyme activity
EC #	BRENDA	ExPASy	KEGG	MetaCyc
3.5.3.15	↗	↗	↗	↗

Gene location (Human)
Chr.	Chromosome 1 (human)
Band	1p36.13	Start	17,249,098 bp
Band	1p36.13	End	17,284,233 bp

Gene location (Mouse)
Chr.	Chromosome 4 (mouse)
Band	4 D3|4 72.5 cM	Start	140,512,676 bp
Band	4 D3|4 72.5 cM	End	140,537,959 bp
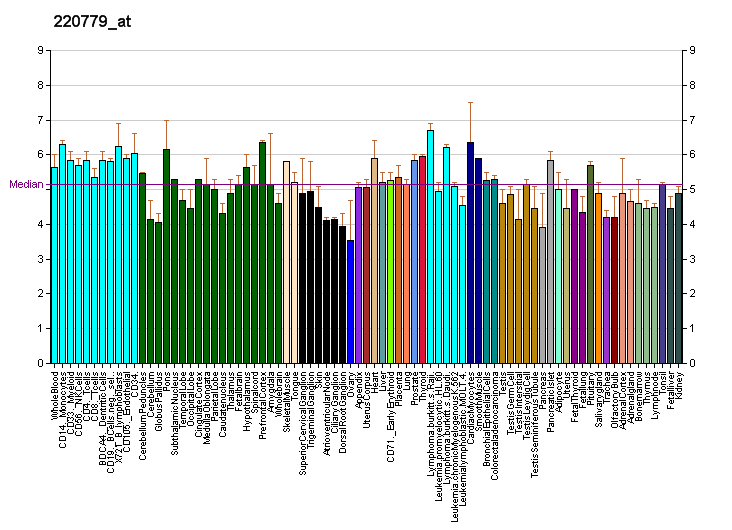
RNA expression pattern
Bgee	Human / Mouse (ortholog); Top expressed in: urinary bladder; testicle; olfactory zone of nasal mucosa; vagina; tonsil; skin of abdomen; gallbladder; gonad; prostate; skin of leg / Top expressed in: lip; hair follicle; skin of back; embryo; granulocyte; skin of abdomen; morula; transitional epithelium of urinary bladder; epiblast; Gonadal ridge; More reference expression data
BioGPS	More reference expression data
Gene ontology
Molecular function	hydrolase activity; calcium ion binding; identical protein binding; protein-arginine deiminase activity
Cellular component	cytosol; nucleus; cytoplasm
Biological process	chromatin organization
Sources:Amigo / QuickGO
Orthologs
Databases	NCBI: entry; OMA: entry
Species	Human	Mouse
Entrez	51702	18601
Ensembl	ENSG00000280549; ENSG00000142619	ENSMUSG00000025328
UniProt	Q9ULW8	Q9Z184
RefSeq (mRNA)	NM_016233	NM_011060
RefSeq (protein)	NP_057317	NP_035190
Location (UCSC)	Chr 1: 17.25 – 17.28 Mb	Chr 4: 140.51 – 140.54 Mb
PubMed search
- Wikidata
View/Edit Human	View/Edit Mouse

Peptidyl arginine deiminase, type III, also known as PADI3, is a protein which in humans is encoded by the PADI3 gene.

This gene encodes a member of the peptidyl arginine deiminase family of enzymes, which catalyze the post-translational deimination of proteins by converting arginine residues into citrullines in the presence of calcium ions. The family members have distinct substrate specificities and tissue-specific expression patterns. The type III enzyme modulates hair structural proteins, such as filaggrin in the hair follicle and trichohyalin in the inner root sheath, during hair follicle formation. Together with the type I enzyme, this enzyme may also play a role in terminal differentiation of the epidermis. This gene exists in a cluster with four other paralogous genes.

== See also ==
- Protein-arginine deiminase
