= AFM-30a =

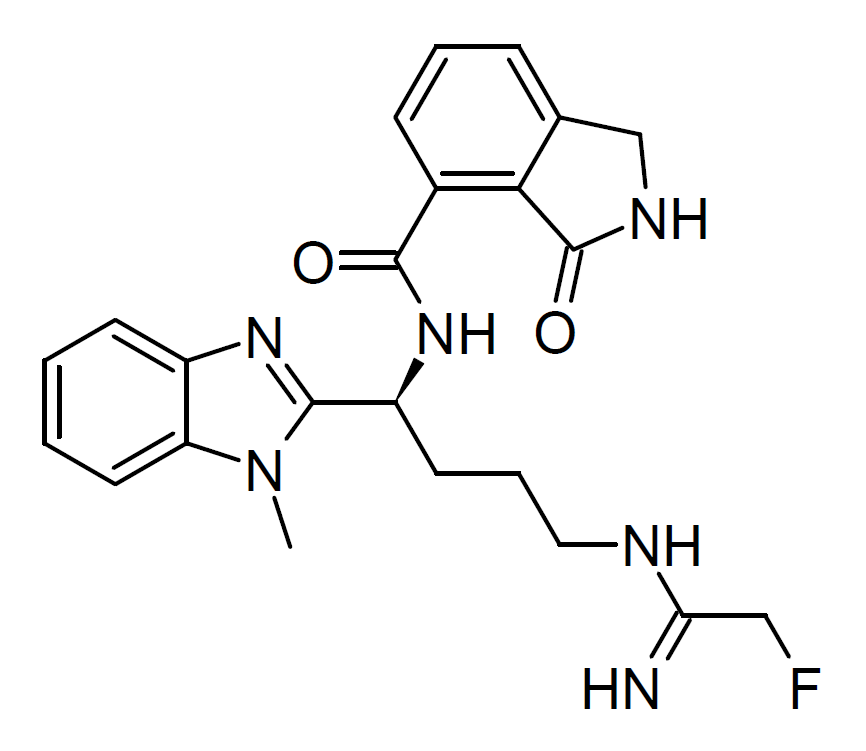

Identifiers
- IUPAC name: N-[(1S)-4-[(1-amino-2-fluoroethylidene)amino]-1-(1-methylbenzimidazol-2-yl)butyl]-3-oxo-1,2-dihydroisoindole-4-carboxamide
- CAS Number: 2095107-57-4
- PubChem CID: 134580863
- ChemSpider: 90657150
- ChEMBL: ChEMBL4216256

Chemical and physical data
- Formula: C_{23}H_{25}FN_{6}O_{2}
- Molar mass: 436.491 g·mol^{−1}
- 3D model (JSmol): Interactive image
- SMILES: CN1C2=CC=CC=C2N=C1[C@H](CCCN=C(CF)N)NC(=O)C3=CC=CC4=C3C(=O)NC4
- InChI: InChI=1S/C23H25FN6O2/c1-30-18-10-3-2-8-16(18)28-21(30)17(9-5-11-26-19(25)12-24)29-22(31)15-7-4-6-14-13-27-23(32)20(14)15/h2-4,6-8,10,17H,5,9,11-13H2,1H3,(H2,25,26)(H,27,32)(H,29,31)/t17-/m0/s1; Key:CHPVRACBRZIQQU-KRWDZBQOSA-N

AFM-30a is an experimental drug which was the first selective inhibitor to be developed of the enzyme peptidylarginine deiminase 2 (PAD2). It has been used to investigate the role of PAD2 in various inflammatory conditions and development of cancers. It was found to be active against pulmonary fibrosis in a mouse model.

== See also ==
- BB-Cl-Amidine
- GSK484
- JBI-589
