= Protein-arginine deiminase =

Enzyme

protein-arginine deiminase
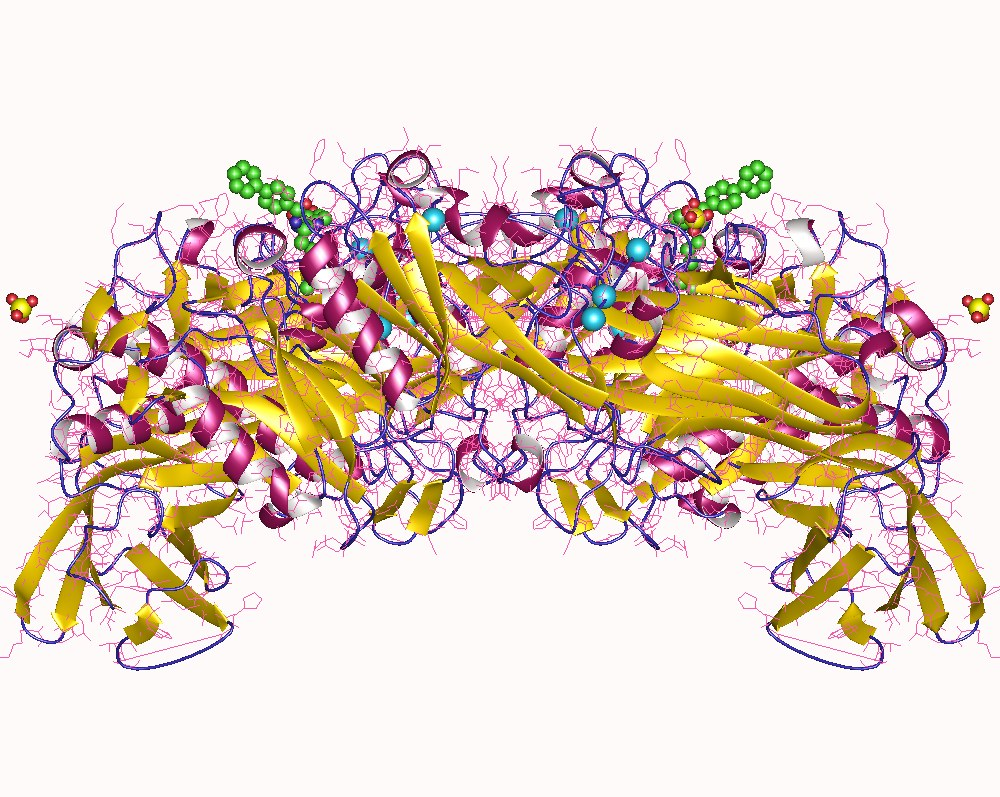
- Protein-arginine deiminase 4, dimer, Human

Identifiers
- EC no.: 3.5.3.15
- CAS no.: 75536-80-0

Databases
- BRENDA: enzyme data
- ExPASy: NiceZyme view
- KEGG: enzyme entry
- MetaCyc: metabolic pathway
- Rhea: reactions
- PDB structures: RCSB PDB PDBe PDBsum
- Gene Ontology: AmiGO / QuickGO
Search
- PMC: articles
- PubMed: articles
- NCBI: proteins

In enzymology, a protein-arginine deiminase (PAD) (EC 3.5.3.15) is an enzyme that catalyzes a form of post translational modification called arginine de-imination or citrullination:

protein L-arginine + H_{2}O $\rightleftharpoons$ protein L-citrulline + NH_{3}

Thus, the two substrates of this enzyme are protein L-arginine (arginine residue inside a protein) and H_{2}O, whereas its two products are protein L-citrulline and NH_{3}:

This enzyme belongs to the family of hydrolases, those acting on carbon-nitrogen bonds other than peptide bonds, specifically in linear amidines. The systematic name of this enzyme class is protein-L-arginine iminohydrolase. This enzyme is also called peptidylarginine deiminase.

== Structural studies ==
As of late 2007, seven structures have been solved for this class of enzymes, with PDB accession codes PDB: 1WD8, PDB: 1WD9, PDB: 1WDA, PDB: 2DEW, PDB: 2DEX, PDB: 2DEY, and PDB: 2DW5.

== Mammalian proteins ==
Mammals have 5 protein-arginine deiminases, with symbols

- PADI1, PADI2, PADI3, PADI4, PADI6

except for rodents, there the letter case is different:

- Padi1, Padi2, Padi3, Padi4, Padi6

The different case is just a historical artifact. It doesn't indicate that the rodent proteins are special.

== Inhibitors ==
Irreversible inhibitors

- Cl-amidine, BB-Cl-Amidine, YW3-56

Reversible inhibitors

- GSK484, GSK199
