= KPLCE =

Human gene

Identifiers
- Aliases: KPLCE, LEP7, XP32, chromosome 1 open reading frame 68, C1orf68, KPRP N-Terminal And LCE C-Terminal Like Protein
- External IDs: MGI: 1913783; GeneCards: KPLCE

Gene location (Human)
Chr.	Chromosome 1 (human)
Band	1q21.3	Start	152,719,522 bp
Band	1q21.3	End	152,720,470 bp

Gene location (Mouse)
Chr.	Chromosome 3 (mouse)
Band	3|3 F1	Start	92,775,666 bp
Band	3|3 F1	End	92,777,523 bp
RNA expression pattern
Bgee	Human / Mouse (ortholog); Top expressed in: skin of leg; skin of abdomen; skin of arm; skin of thigh; testicle; skin of hip; nipple; human penis; gastrocnemius muscle; vulva / Top expressed in: skin of external ear; lip; skin of back; umbilical cord; esophagus; skin of abdomen; sexually immature organism; epidermis; stomach; cornea; More reference expression data
BioGPS	n/a
Gene ontology
Molecular function	structural molecule activity; molecular function
Cellular component	cytoplasm; cornified envelope
Biological process	peptide cross-linking; keratinocyte differentiation; epidermis development
Sources:Amigo / QuickGO
Orthologs
Databases	NCBI: entry; OMA: entry
Species	Human	Mouse
Entrez	100129271	66533
Ensembl	ENSG00000198854	ENSMUSG00000090314
UniProt	Q5T750	G5E8Z3
RefSeq (mRNA)	NM_001024679	NM_025621
RefSeq (protein)	NP_001019850	NP_079897
Location (UCSC)	Chr 1: 152.72 – 152.72 Mb	Chr 3: 92.78 – 92.78 Mb
PubMed search
- Wikidata
View/Edit Human	View/Edit Mouse

Protein KPLCE, also called skin-specific protein 32, is a protein that in humans is encoded by the gene KPLCE (previously C1orf68). KPLCE is expressed in the skin, is a part of the epidermal differentiation complex, and potentially plays a role in epidermal cornification, and epidermal barrier function.

== Gene ==
C1orf68 is mapped on the plus strand of chromosome 1 at 1q21.3, that spans 949 base pairs in the human genome. Other aliases include Late envelope protein 7 (LEP7), XP32, Skin-Specific Protein (Xp32). This gene has only 1 exon, and no introns. It is a part of the epidermal differentiation complex (1q21).

== Protein ==
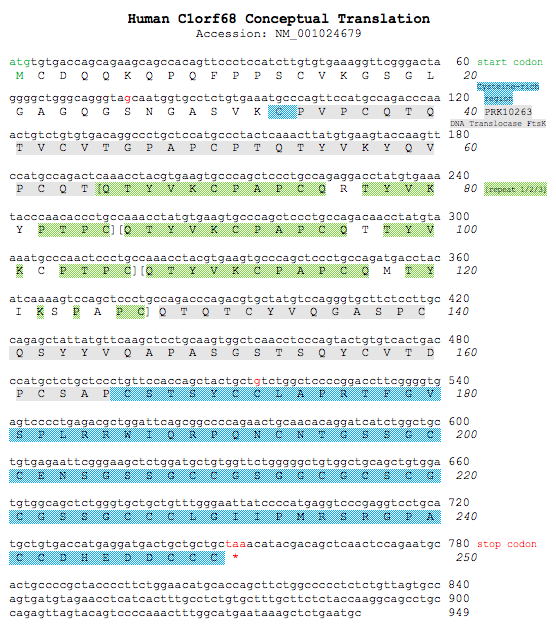
Human C1orf68 conceptual translation of mRNA and protein sequence

Skin-specific protein 32 has only one isoform, and has a sequence length of 250 amino acids. It has a molecular mass of 26 kDa, and a predicted pI value of 8.41. It was noted that the amino acid sequence contained high levels of cysteine relative to other human protein sequences.

=== Domains, repeats ===
Skin-specific protein 32 has one domain, PRK10264, which is a DNA translocase FtsK. It also contains a cysteine rich region, which is shown to be conserved across most mammal orthologs, excluding Monotremes.

The protein sequence also contains a repeat sequence, the three continuous repeat sequences are located from amino acid position Gln65 to Cys127. The repeat sequences can be observed in the conceptual translation on the right. They are within the DNA translocase Ftsk domain and the cysteine rich region. The repeat sequences are conserved across mammal orthologs. The conservation of each individual amino acid can be observed in the LOGO below.

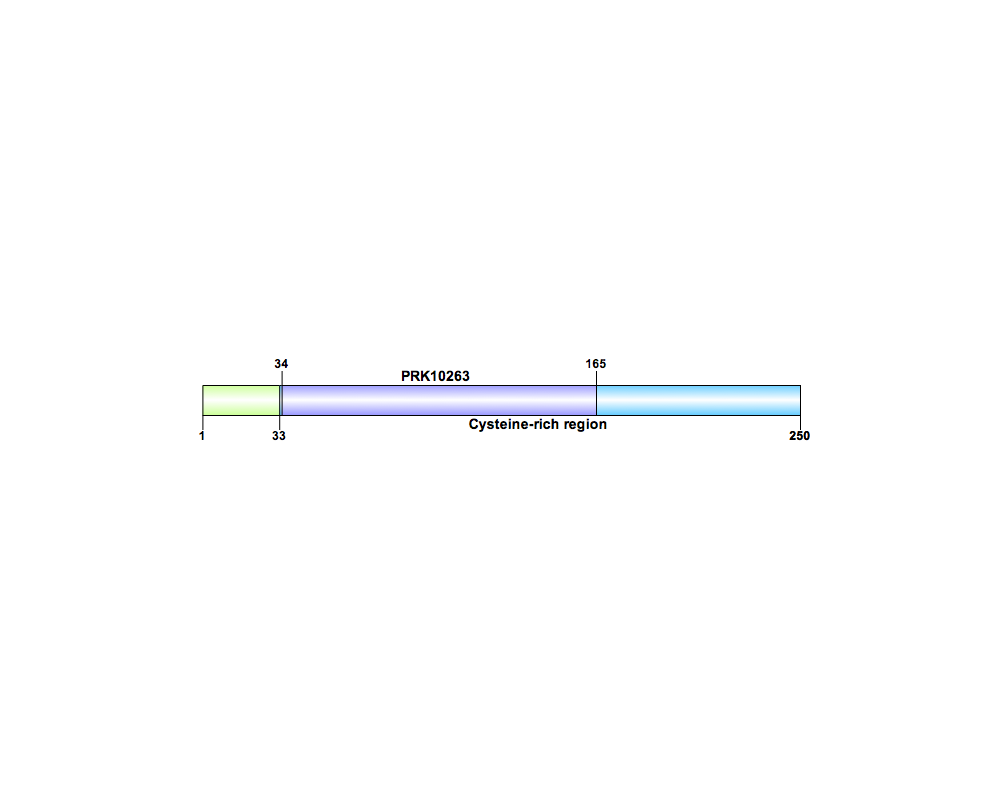
Diagram of human C1orf68 protein domains, which includes PRK10263 (DNA translocase Ftsk) and cysteine-rich region

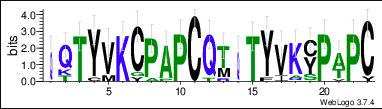
LOGO of repeat sequences in human C1orf68 conserved across select orthologs, Rhinopithecus roxellana (Golden snub-nosed monkey), Cavia porcellus (Guinea Pig), and Myotis brandtii (Brandt's bat)

== Gene level regulation ==
=== Promoter ===
One promoter was identified for C1orf68 using ElDorado Genomatics. This promoter, GXP_1818199, spans 1,040 bases and overlaps C1orf68 by 40 bases. Since C1orf68 does not contain a 5'-UTR, the promoter overlaps the start codon, which can be visualized in the diagram below.

Human C1orf68 (exon 1) with Promoter GXP_1818199 diagram. Start and stop codons represented as green and red arrows respectively.

=== Expression pattern ===
C1orf68 is expressed in a select few tissues, specifically in the skin and in breast tissue. In humans, C1orf68 protein abundance is moderate. In terms of specific cell types within the skin, C1orf68 is expressed in suprabasal keratinocytes, which are a type of epithelial cell. It has also been noted that C1orf68 is moderately expressed in stratum corneum and granular layer of skin. This could be because the protein remains in the cell as it differentiates and matures.

== Transcript level regulation ==
Predicted C1orf68 3'-UTR mRNA secondary structure with a Gibbs free energy of -41.19, created by mFold.

C1orf68 does not contain a 5'-UTR, but does contain a 3'-UTR. The predicted secondary structure of C1orf68's 3'-UTR mRNA contains various stem loops. The stem loop containing PUM2 RNA protein binding site, which was shown in all of the predicted structures created by mFold.

== Protein level regulation ==
=== Subcellular localization ===
Skin-specific protein 32 is predicted to be localized in the cytoplasm. The protein has been shown to occupy the cytoplasm within skin cells, which can be observed in the immunofluorescence staining in Human Protein Atlas, Subcellular.

== Evolution ==
=== Paralogs ===
There are no known paralogs of C1orf68.

=== Orthologs ===
C1orf68 has a range of orthologs within mammals, and some amphibians, specifically shown in two frog species. The ortholog sequence similarity percentages range from 96 to 23%. There are no orthologs in birds, fish, and reptiles but there was a few in amphibians. Additionally, within the mammals, there was no orthologs in Cetacea (marine mammals). The most highly conserved amino acids across mammals and amphibians with available sequences are Pro61, Pro73, Pro126, Pro182, which are all proline amino acids.

Genus Species	Common name	Taxonomic group	Divergence Data (MYA) Median Time	Accession number	Query Cover	Sequence length (aa)	Sequence identity (%)	Sequence similarity (%)
Homo sapiens	Human	Primates	0	NP_001019850	100%	250	100%	100%
Rhinopithecus roxellana	Golden snub-nosed monkey	Primates	29	XP_030792113	98%	250	94%	96%
Callithrix jacchus	Common marmoset	Primates	43	XP_035135776	96%	256	83%	85%
Cavia porcellus	Guinea pig	Rotentia	89	XP_005007858	96%	249	80%	84%
Ochotona curzoniae	Plateau pika	Glires	89	XP_040854203	100%	241	77%	80%
Sus scrofa	Wild boar	Artiodactyla	94	XP_003125804	96%	248	79%	82%
Myotis brandtii	Brandt's bat	Chiroptera	94	XP_005880696	98%	248	75%	79%
Sorex araneus	Common shrew	Eulipotyphla	94	XP_004618165	76%	261	70%	73%
Orycteropus afer	Aardvark	Afrotheria	102	XP_007956474	98%	270	73%	76%
Echinops telfairi	Lesser hedgehog tenrec	Afrotheria	102	XP_004717741	91%	262	73%	75%
Dasypus novemcinctus	Nine-banded armadillo	Xenarthra	102	XP_004469783	100%	257	71%	76%
Trichosurus vulpecula	Common brushtail possum	Diprotodontia	160	XP_036609710	100%	254	62%	67%
Phascolarctos cinereus	Koala	Diprotodontia	160	XP_020847076	100%	266	60%	65%
Vombatus ursinus	Common wombat	Diprotodontia	160	XP_027726322	100%	291	52%	58%
Sarcophilus harrisii	Tasmanian devil	Dasyuromorphia	160	XP_003770670	99%	268	52%	60%
Dromiciops gliroides	Colocolo opossum	Microbiotheria	160	XP_043856143	100%	317	51%	57%
Monodelphis domestica	Gray short-tailed opossum	Didelphimorphia	160	XP_016285839	96%	292	54%	59%
Ornithorhynchus anatinus	Platypus	Monotremata	180	XP_028910439	98%	244	50%	56%
Tachyglossus aculeatus	Short-beaked echidna	Monotremata	180	XP_038624254	98%	264	47%	54%
Ranitomeya imitator	Mimic poison frog	Anura	352	CAF5025995	96%	251	26%	33%
Xenopus tropicalis	Western clawed frog	Anura	352	KAE8606393	54%	296	23%	33%

The figure below shows more information about the evolutionary rate of C1orf68 throughout its orthologs. The rate of evolution of C1orf68 was observed to be fast when comparing to cytochrome c and fibrinogen alpha. This observation is determined since C1orf68 appears to evolve at a similar rate to fibrinogen alpha, which serves as a standard for rapidly evolving genes.

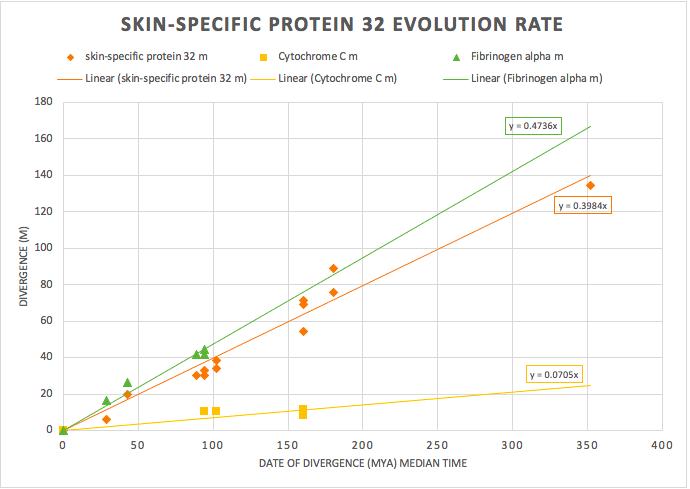
Rate of evolution comparison between C1orf68, Cytochrome C, and Fibrinogen Alpha. C1orf68 appears to evolve at a similar rate to Fibrinogen alpha, which serves as a standard for rapidly evolving genes. Showing how the corrected % divergence (m) changes over time (Date of Divergence (MYA) Median Time).

== Interacting proteins ==
=== Transcription factor binding sites ===
Three different transcription factors for C1orf68 were predicted and obtained from MatInspector Genomatics.

==== GRHL2 ====
Grainyhead-like 2 has been shown to impair keratinocyte differentiation through transcriptional inhibition of the gene in the epidermal differentiation complex. Also showed enhanced protein and mRNA levels in chronic skin lesions, such as in psoriasis.

==== ZEB1 ====
Zinc finger E-box-binding homeobox 1 has been shown to regulate corneal epithelial terminal phenotype.

==== GATA3 ====
GATA-binding factor 3 has been shown localized in the cytoplasm and nucleus of proliferating keratinocytes but only in the nucleus in differentiated keratinocytes. It has also been shown that GATA3 induces differentiation of primary keratinocytes, and suggested that it may regulate human interfollicular epidermal renewal.

=== Protein-protein interactions ===
Other potential proteins that interact with C1orf68 are located in the table below. These proteins were selected from the results from prediction tools because of their participation in the epidermal cornified envelope, the location of their gene within the epidermal differentiation complex, and the localization to the cytoplasm.

Abbreviated Name	Full Name	Basis of Identification	Protein Description
KPRP	Keratinocyte proline-rich protein	Affinity Capture-MS	This protein's gene is located on the epidermal differentiation complex on chromosome 1q21. Protein has a potential role in keratinocyte differentiation.
TGM3	Transglutaminase 3	Affinity Capture-MS	An epidermal cross-linking enzyme, it's involved with the formation of the cornfield envelope.
CYLD	CYLD Lysine 63 Deubiquitinase	Affinity chromatography technology	This protein functions as a deubiquitinating enzyme, and is localized in the cytoplasm.

== Clinical significance ==
=== Psoriasis ===
C1orf68 is expressed differently when we look at samples of healthy skin, skin with psoriasis without lesions and skin with psoriasis with lesions. In one study, it was suggested that proteins with significant differences in expression in skin with psoriasis without lesions and skin with psoriasis with lesions, could contribute to maintaining the non-lesional state and may add to our understanding of lesion formation.
