= ASPRV1 =

Protein-coding gene in humans

Identifiers
- Aliases: ASPRV1, MUNO, SASP, SASPase, Taps, aspartic peptidase, retroviral-like 1, aspartic peptidase retroviral like 1
- External IDs: OMIM: 611765; MGI: 1915105; GeneCards: ASPRV1

Gene location (Human)
Chr.	Chromosome 2 (human)
Band	2p13.3	Start	69,960,089 bp
Band	2p13.3	End	69,962,265 bp

Gene location (Mouse)
Chr.	Chromosome 6 (mouse)
Band	6|6 D1	Start	86,605,146 bp
Band	6|6 D1	End	86,606,692 bp
RNA expression pattern
Bgee	Human / Mouse (ortholog); Top expressed in: skin of arm; skin of thigh; nipple; human penis; skin of hip; vulva; skin of abdomen; pancreatic ductal cell; endothelial cell; blood / Top expressed in: esophagus; lip; granulocyte; superior surface of tongue; skin of abdomen; skin of external ear; conjunctival fornix; skin of back; corneal stroma; umbilical cord; More reference expression data
BioGPS	n/a
Gene ontology
Molecular function	peptidase activity; hydrolase activity; aspartic-type endopeptidase activity
Cellular component	integral component of membrane; membrane
Biological process	protein processing; skin development; proteolysis
Sources:Amigo / QuickGO
Orthologs
Databases	NCBI: entry; OMA: entry
Species	Human	Mouse
Entrez	151516	67855
Ensembl	ENSG00000244617	ENSMUSG00000033508
UniProt	Q53RT3	Q09PK2
RefSeq (mRNA)	NM_152792	NM_026414
RefSeq (protein)	NP_690005	NP_080690
Location (UCSC)	Chr 2: 69.96 – 69.96 Mb	Chr 6: 86.61 – 86.61 Mb
PubMed search
- Wikidata
View/Edit Human	View/Edit Mouse

Retroviral-like aspartic protease 1 is an enzyme that in humans is encoded by the ASPRV1 gene. This enzyme processes filaggrin, which is involved in the organization of the epidermis. Pathogenic mutations in ASPRV1 are associated with a type of ichthyosis called autosomal dominant lamellar ichthyosis (ADLI).
