= BB-Cl-Amidine =

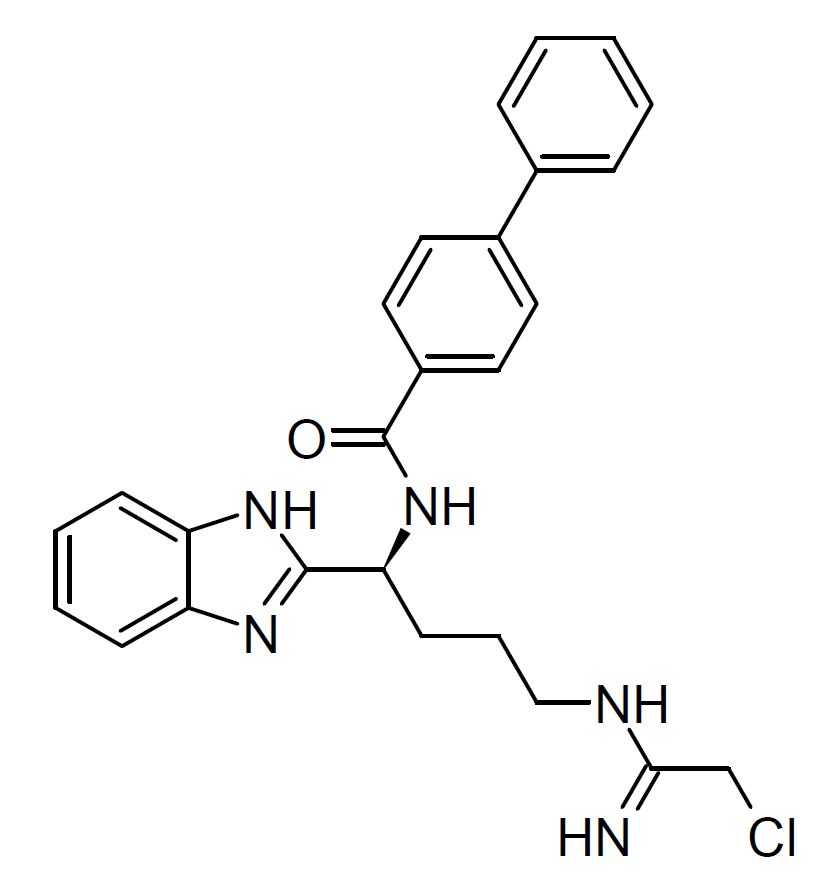

Identifiers
- IUPAC name: N-[(1S)-4-[(1-amino-2-chloroethylidene)amino]-1-(1H-benzimidazol-2-yl)butyl]-4-phenylbenzamide
- CAS Number: 1802637-39-3
- PubChem CID: 129021946
- ChemSpider: 52082909
- ChEMBL: ChEMBL4204476

Chemical and physical data
- Formula: C_{26}H_{26}ClN_{5}O
- Molar mass: 459.98 g·mol^{−1}
- 3D model (JSmol): Interactive image
- SMILES: C1=CC=C(C=C1)C2=CC=C(C=C2)C(=O)N[C@@H](CCCN=C(CCl)N)C3=NC4=CC=CC=C4N3
- InChI: InChI=1S/C26H26ClN5O/c27-17-24(28)29-16-6-11-23(25-30-21-9-4-5-10-22(21)31-25)32-26(33)20-14-12-19(13-15-20)18-7-2-1-3-8-18/h1-5,7-10,12-15,23H,6,11,16-17H2,(H2,28,29)(H,30,31)(H,32,33)/t23-/m0/s1; Key:YDOAWJHYHGBQFI-QHCPKHFHSA-N

BB-Cl-Amidine is an experimental drug which acts as a non-subtype selective, irreversible inhibitor of the enzyme peptidylarginine deiminase (PAD). It has anti-cancer effects and is useful for various inflammatory conditions such as arthritis, and while it may be unlikely to be developed for human use due to toxicity concerns, it is widely used in scientific research. As well as its activity as a PAD inhibitor, BB-Cl-Amidine also inhibits the action of the Stimulator of interferon genes (STING) protein by preventing STING oligomerization and thereby terminating the signalling pathway.

== See also ==
- AFM-30a
- GSK484
- JBI-589
