= Mutated citrullinated vimentin =

Detection of autoantibodies against mutated citrullinated vimentin is part of rheumatoid arthritis (RA) diagnostics, especially in sera negative for rheumatoid factor (RF negative sera). Anti-MCV antibodies are a member of the ACPA family, a group of the so-called antibodies to citrullinated protein/peptide antigens.

Rheumatoid arthritis is an autoimmune disorder. Detection of specific autoantibodies (antibodies directed against the body’s own tissue) such as rheumatoid factors and ACPAs may provide indication of the disease. In many cases, autoimmune diagnostics are crucial for diagnosing RA correctly and already in the disease’s early stages, when typical symptoms often are lacking but when medical therapy is most effective.

== Basics ==
Citrullination is a modification of proteins where a nitrogen in the amino acid arginine is replaced with an oxygen, converting it into citrulline. The modified (citrullinated) protein may be identified by as foreign, provoking an autoimmune inflammation response.

Various kinds of citrullinated proteins have been detected in the joints of RA patients. One of these is Sa antigen, now known as mutated citrullinated vimentin (MCV).

Citrullination of vimentin plays a decisive role in RA pathogenesis.

== Significance ==
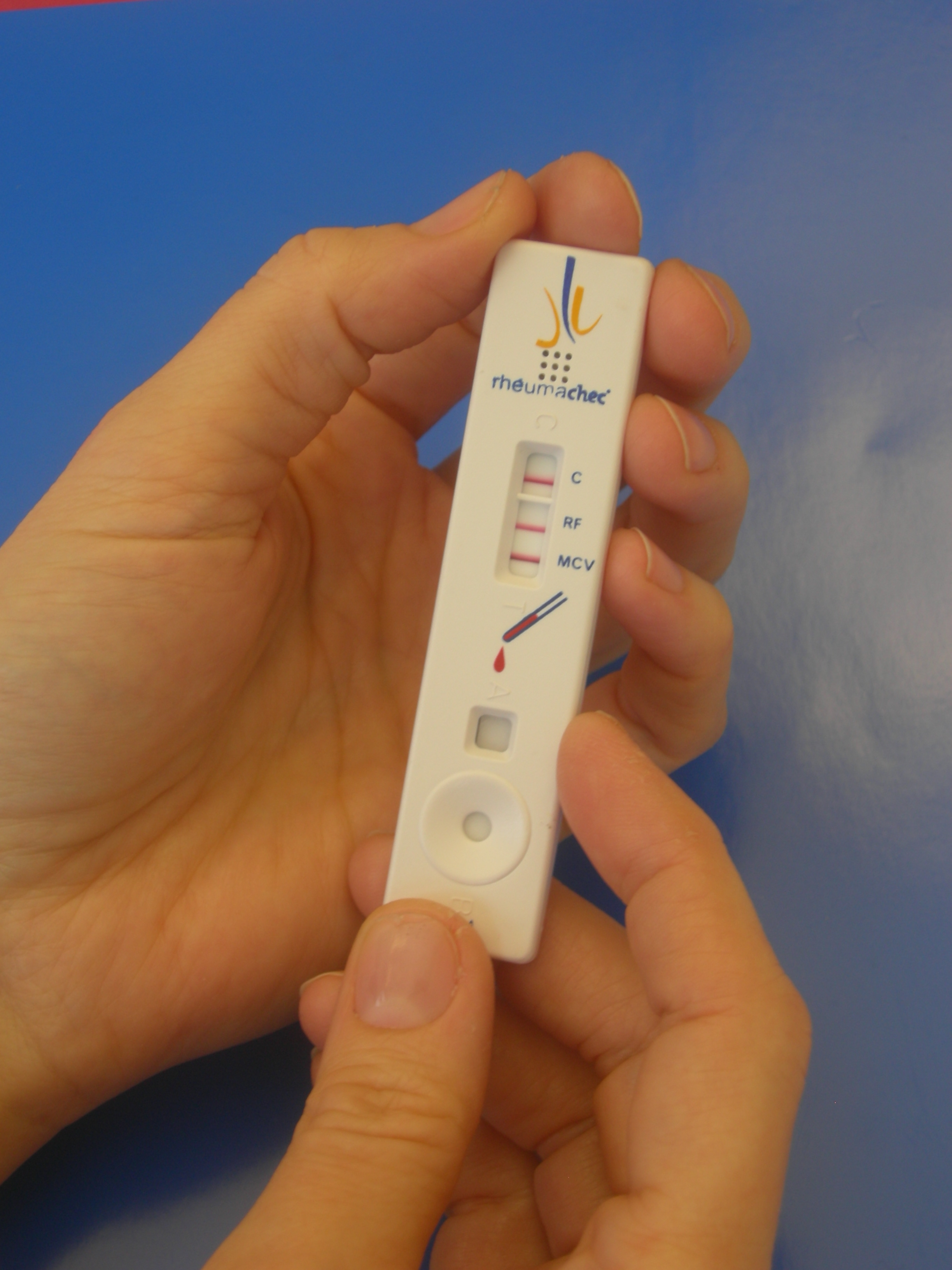
point-of-care testing for rheumatoid arthritis using the rheumachec rapid test

In rheumatology diagnostics, autoantibodies against mutated citrullinated vimentin (anti-MCV) are of prominent diagnostic and prognostic value. Their significance is greater than that of rheumatoid factor.

Recently a serological point-of-care test (POCT) for the early detection of RA has been developed. This assay combines the detection of rheumatoid factor and anti-MCV for diagnosis of rheumatoid arthritis and shows a sensitivity of 72% and specificity of 99.7%.

Anti-MCV are used as efficient biomarkers for estimating progress of rheumatoid arthritis. Main advantage of testing for anti-MCV is the early appearance of the anti-MCV antibodies, what allows for detection of early RA and submits adequate therapy just after the disease’s onset. Moreover, anti-MCV titres show strong correlation to disease activity, disease severity and the success of therapy.
