= SPRR3 =

Protein-coding gene in humans

Identifiers
- Aliases: SPRR3, small proline rich protein 3
- External IDs: OMIM: 182271; MGI: 1330237; GeneCards: SPRR3

Gene location (Human)
Chr.	Chromosome 1 (human)
Band	1q21.3	Start	153,001,747 bp
Band	1q21.3	End	153,003,856 bp

Gene location (Mouse)
Chr.	Chromosome 3 (mouse)
Band	3 F1|3 40.14 cM	Start	92,363,809 bp
Band	3 F1|3 40.14 cM	End	92,366,027 bp
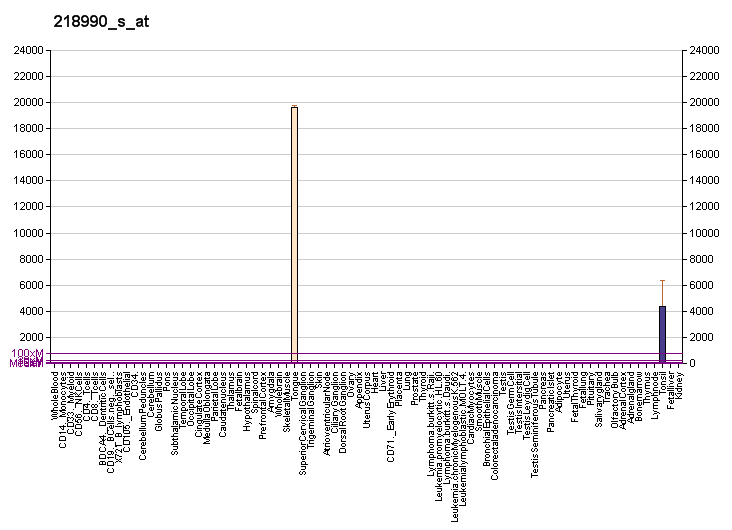
RNA expression pattern
Bgee	Human / Mouse (ortholog); Top expressed in: mucosa of pharynx; oral cavity; buccal mucosa cell; body of tongue; amniotic fluid; gums; gingival epithelium; periodontal fiber; cervix epithelium; superior surface of tongue / Top expressed in: superior surface of tongue; esophagus; molar; stomach; mucous cell of stomach; cervix; umbilical cord; lip; sexually immature organism; tracheobronchial tree; More reference expression data
BioGPS	More reference expression data
Gene ontology
Molecular function	structural molecule activity; protein binding
Cellular component	extracellular exosome; cytoplasm; cornified envelope; cytosol; Golgi apparatus; perinuclear region of cytoplasm
Biological process	wound healing; keratinization; keratinocyte differentiation; peptide cross-linking; epidermis development; cornification
Sources:Amigo / QuickGO
Orthologs
Databases	NCBI: entry; OMA: entry
Species	Human	Mouse
Entrez	6707	20766
Ensembl	ENSG00000163209	ENSMUSG00000045539
UniProt	Q9UBC9	O09116
RefSeq (mRNA)	NM_005416; NM_001097589	NM_001204427; NM_011478
RefSeq (protein)	NP_001091058; NP_005407	NP_001191356; NP_035608
Location (UCSC)	Chr 1: 153 – 153 Mb	Chr 3: 92.36 – 92.37 Mb
PubMed search
- Wikidata
View/Edit Human	View/Edit Mouse

Small proline-rich protein 3 is a protein that in humans is encoded by the SPRR3 gene, which is found within the epidermal differentiation complex (EDC).
