= ACR score =

Scale to measure change in rheumatoid arthritis symptoms

- Purpose: Quantify degree of symptoms in rheumatoid arthritis

ACR score is a scale to measure change in rheumatoid arthritis symptoms. It is named after the American College of Rheumatology. The ACR score is more often used in clinical trials than in doctor patient-relationships, as it allows a common standard between researchers.

Different degrees of improvement are referred to as ACR20, ACR50, ACR70. ACR20 was initially proposed with ACR scoring, measuring a 20% improvement on a scale of 28 intervals. ACR50 and ACR70 were later proposed, corresponding to 50% and 70% improvements.

The Rheumatoid Arthritis Severity Scale (RASS) is based on sections of the ACR scoring system.

The 2010 ACR / EULAR Rheumatoid Arthritis Classification Criteria, which includes anti-CCP testing, has been developed to focus on early disease, and on features that are associated with persistent or erosive disease.
