= Lucid-PSYCH =

Clinical data
- Other names: LUCID-PSYCH; Lucid-201
- Drug class: Undefined; Psychedelic; Hallucinogen

Lucid-PSYCH, or LUCID-PSYCH, also known as Lucid-201, is a psychedelic hallucinogen which is under development for the treatment of major depressive disorder. It is under development by Lucid Psycheceuticals. Lucid-PSYCH's exact mechanism of action is undefined. As of March 2023, it is in preclinical research and is progressing to phase 1 clinical trials.

== See also ==
- List of investigational hallucinogens and entactogens
- List of investigational antidepressants
- Lucid-MS
