= Jumping translocation breakpoint =

Protein found in humans

JTB

Identifiers
- Aliases: JTB, HHSPC222, PAR, hJT, jumping translocation breakpoint
- External IDs: OMIM: 604671; MGI: 1346082; GeneCards: JTB
Available structures
PDB	Ortholog search: PDBe RCSB
PDB	List of PDB id codes 2KJX

Gene location (Human)
Chr.	Chromosome 1 (human)
Band	1q21.3	Start	153,974,269 bp
Band	1q21.3	End	153,977,674 bp

Gene location (Mouse)
Chr.	Chromosome 3 (mouse)
Band	3|3 F1	Start	90,138,904 bp
Band	3|3 F1	End	90,143,145 bp
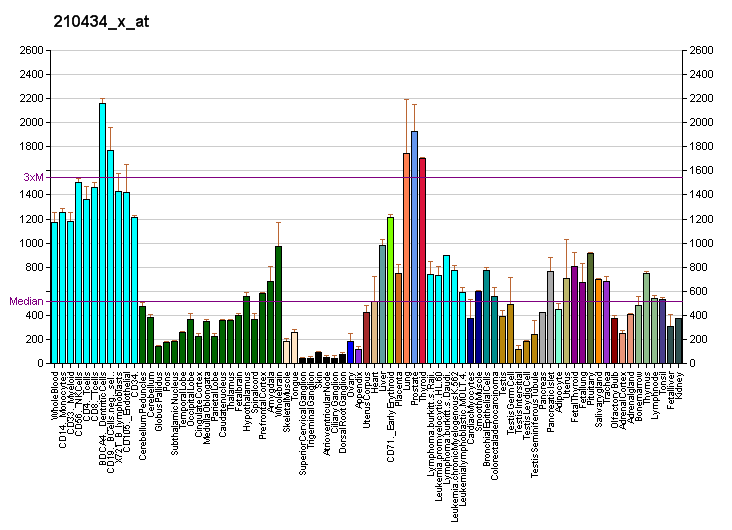

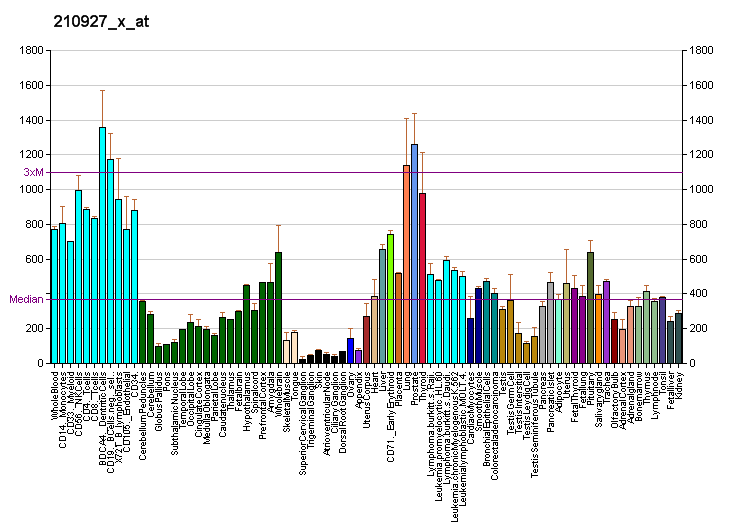
RNA expression pattern
Bgee	Human / Mouse (ortholog); Top expressed in: parotid gland; mucosa of ileum; mucosa of sigmoid colon; tibia; pancreatic ductal cell; body of pancreas; skin of thigh; pituitary gland; anterior pituitary; Epithelium of choroid plexus / Top expressed in: parotid gland; Ileal epithelium; saccule; seminal vesicula; Paneth cell; lacrimal gland; epithelium of lens; triceps brachii muscle; sternocleidomastoid muscle; vastus lateralis muscle; More reference expression data
BioGPS	More reference expression data
Gene ontology
Molecular function	protein kinase binding
Cellular component	cytoplasm; integral component of membrane; centrosome; spindle; midbody; integral component of plasma membrane; cytoskeleton; membrane; mitochondrion; microtubule organizing center
Biological process	apoptotic process; cell division; cell cycle; apoptotic mitochondrial changes; regulation of cell population proliferation; positive regulation of protein kinase activity; mitotic cell cycle; mitotic cytokinesis
Sources:Amigo / QuickGO
Orthologs
Databases	NCBI: entry; OMA: entry
Species	Human	Mouse
Entrez	10899	23922
Ensembl	ENSG00000143543	ENSMUSG00000027937
UniProt	O76095	O88824
RefSeq (mRNA)	NM_006694	NM_206924
RefSeq (protein)	NP_006685	NP_996807
Location (UCSC)	Chr 1: 153.97 – 153.98 Mb	Chr 3: 90.14 – 90.14 Mb
PubMed search
- Wikidata
View/Edit Human	View/Edit Mouse

Jumping translocation breakpoint protein (JTB)

Identifiers
- Symbol: JTB
- Pfam: PF05439
- InterPro: IPR008657
Available protein structures:
- PDB: IPR008657 PF05439 (ECOD; PDBsum)
- AlphaFold: IPR008657; PF05439

The jumping translocation breakpoint protein (JTB), also known as prostate androgen-regulated protein (PAR), is a protein that in humans is encoded by the JTB gene. It is an orphan receptor with unknown function.

The JTB family of proteins contains several jumping translocation breakpoint proteins or JTBs. Jumping translocation (JT) is an unbalanced translocation that comprises amplified chromosomal segments jumping to various telomeres. JTB has been found to fuse with the telomeric repeats of acceptor telomeres in a case of JT. Homo sapiens JTB (hJTB) encodes a transmembrane protein that is highly conserved among divergent eukaryotic species. JT results in a hJTB truncation, which potentially produces an hJTB product devoid of the transmembrane domain. hJTB is located in a gene-rich region at 1q21, called epidermal differentiation complex (EDC). JTB has also been implicated in prostatic carcinomas.
