= SPRR2A =

Protein-coding gene in humans

Identifiers
- Aliases: SPRR2A, small proline rich protein 2A
- External IDs: OMIM: 182267; MGI: 1330343; GeneCards: SPRR2A

Gene location (Human)
Chr.	Chromosome 1 (human)
Band	1q21.3	Start	153,056,120 bp
Band	1q21.3	End	153,057,512 bp

Gene location (Mouse)
Chr.	Chromosome 3 (mouse)
Band	3 F1|3 40.14 cM	Start	92,292,992 bp
Band	3 F1|3 40.14 cM	End	92,294,631 bp
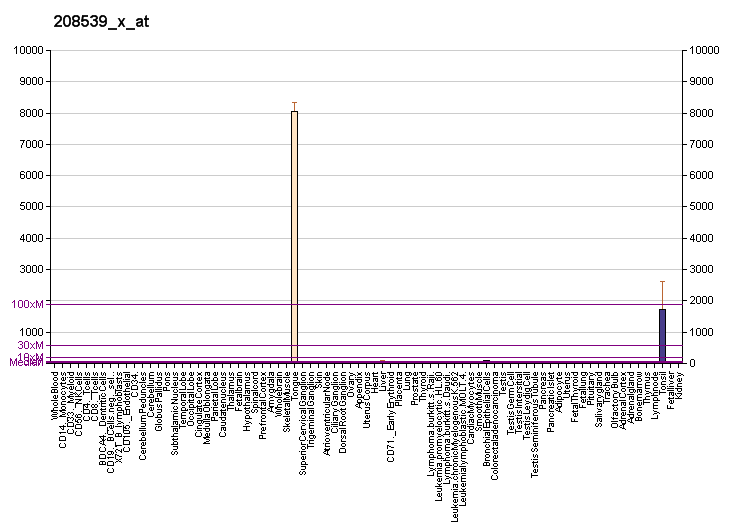
RNA expression pattern
Bgee	Human / Mouse (ortholog); Top expressed in: buccal mucosa cell; gums; gingival epithelium; body of tongue; amniotic fluid; mucosa of pharynx; oral cavity; human penis; nasal epithelium; vulva / Top expressed in: gastrula; decidua; cervix; skin of back; lip; skin of abdomen; skin of external ear; umbilical cord; sexually immature organism; esophagus; More reference expression data
BioGPS	More reference expression data
Gene ontology
Molecular function	protein binding; structural molecule activity
Cellular component	cytoplasm; cornified envelope; cytosol
Biological process	peptide cross-linking; keratinization; keratinocyte differentiation; epidermis development; cornification
Sources:Amigo / QuickGO
Orthologs
Databases	NCBI: entry; OMA: entry
Species	Human	Mouse
Entrez	6700	20762
Ensembl	ENSG00000241794	ENSMUSG00000046259
UniProt	P35326	O70559
RefSeq (mRNA)	NM_005988	NM_011474
RefSeq (protein)	NP_005979	NP_035604
Location (UCSC)	Chr 1: 153.06 – 153.06 Mb	Chr 3: 92.29 – 92.29 Mb
PubMed search
- Wikidata
View/Edit Human	View/Edit Mouse

Small proline-rich protein 2A is a protein that in humans is encoded by the SPRR2A gene.
