= SPRR1B =

Protein-coding gene in humans

Identifiers
- Aliases: SPRR1B, CORNIFIN, GADD33, SPRR1, SPR-IB, small proline rich protein 1B
- External IDs: OMIM: 182266; GeneCards: SPRR1B

Gene location (Human)
| Chr. | Chromosome 1 (human) |
| Band | 1q21.3 | Start | 153,031,203 bp |
| Band | 1q21.3 | End | 153,032,900 bp |
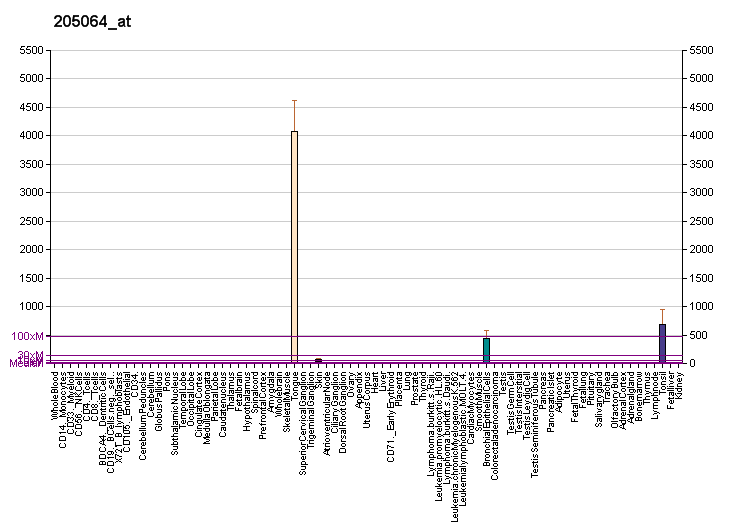
RNA expression pattern
| Bgee | Human / Mouse (ortholog); Top expressed in: amniotic fluid; gums; gingival epithelium; human penis; buccal mucosa cell; vulva; mucosa of pharynx; body of tongue; periodontal fiber; oral cavity / n/a; More reference expression data |
| BioGPS | More reference expression data |
Gene ontology
| Molecular function | protein-macromolecule adaptor activity; structural molecule activity |
| Cellular component | cornified envelope; cytosol; cytoplasm |
| Biological process | keratinization; keratinocyte differentiation; epidermis development; peptide cross-linking; cornification |
Sources:Amigo / QuickGO
Orthologs
| Databases | NCBI: entry; OMA: entry |
| Species | Human | Mouse |
| Entrez | 6699 | n/a |
| Ensembl | ENSG00000169469 | n/a |
| UniProt | P22528 | n/a |
| RefSeq (mRNA) | NM_003125 | n/a |
| RefSeq (protein) | NP_003116 | n/a |
| Location (UCSC) | Chr 1: 153.03 – 153.03 Mb | n/a |
| PubMed search | | n/a |
- Wikidata
| View/Edit Human |

Cornifin-B is a protein that in humans is encoded by the SPRR1B gene.
