= Repetin =

Protein found in humans

RPTN

Identifiers
- Aliases: RPTN, Repetin
- External IDs: OMIM: 613259; MGI: 1099055; GeneCards: RPTN

Gene location (Human)
Chr.	Chromosome 1 (human)
Band	1q21.3	Start	152,153,595 bp
Band	1q21.3	End	152,159,228 bp

Gene location (Mouse)
Chr.	Chromosome 3 (mouse)
Band	3|3 F2.1	Start	93,301,006 bp
Band	3|3 F2.1	End	93,306,749 bp
RNA expression pattern
Bgee	Human / Mouse (ortholog); Top expressed in: gums; gingival epithelium; tongue; body of tongue; superior surface of tongue; skin of leg; sperm; amniotic fluid; epithelium of nasopharynx; skin of hip / Top expressed in: esophagus; superior surface of tongue; lip; molar; mucous cell of stomach; sexually immature organism; skin of abdomen; skin of back; cervix; skin of external ear; More reference expression data
BioGPS	n/a
Gene ontology
Molecular function	metal ion binding; calcium ion binding; transition metal ion binding
Cellular component	extracellular region; cytosol; cornified envelope
Biological process	cornification
Sources:Amigo / QuickGO
Orthologs
Databases	NCBI: entry; OMA: entry
Species	Human	Mouse
Entrez	126638	20129
Ensembl	ENSG00000215853	ENSMUSG00000041984
UniProt	Q6XPR3	P97347
RefSeq (mRNA)	NM_152364; NM_001122965	NM_009100
RefSeq (protein)	NP_001116437	NP_033126
Location (UCSC)	Chr 1: 152.15 – 152.16 Mb	Chr 3: 93.3 – 93.31 Mb
PubMed search
- Wikidata
View/Edit Human	View/Edit Mouse

Repetin is an extracellular matrix protein expressed in the epidermis. In humans it is encoded by the RPTN gene. Repetin is part of the S100 fused-type protein family and contains an EF hand structural domain.

It functions in the cornified cell envelope formation. It is a multifunctional epidermal matrix protein. RPTN reversibly binds calcium.

RPTN is 5,634 bases long. It starts 152,126,071 base pairs from pter. It ends 152,131,704 base pairs from pter. It has a minus strand orientation.

RPTN is one of the genes that differ between present-day humans and Neanderthals. RPTN helps protect skin cells, and since the Neanderthals were missing this protein, the Neanderthals were better adapted to the cold, but less so to disease.
