= SPRR1A =

Protein-coding gene in humans

Identifiers
- Aliases: SPRR1A, SPRK, small proline rich protein 1A
- External IDs: OMIM: 182265; MGI: 106660; GeneCards: SPRR1A

Gene location (Human)
Chr.	Chromosome 1 (human)
Band	1q21.3	Start	152,984,081 bp
Band	1q21.3	End	152,985,814 bp

Gene location (Mouse)
Chr.	Chromosome 3 (mouse)
Band	3 F1|3 40.14 cM	Start	92,391,259 bp
Band	3 F1|3 40.14 cM	End	92,393,202 bp
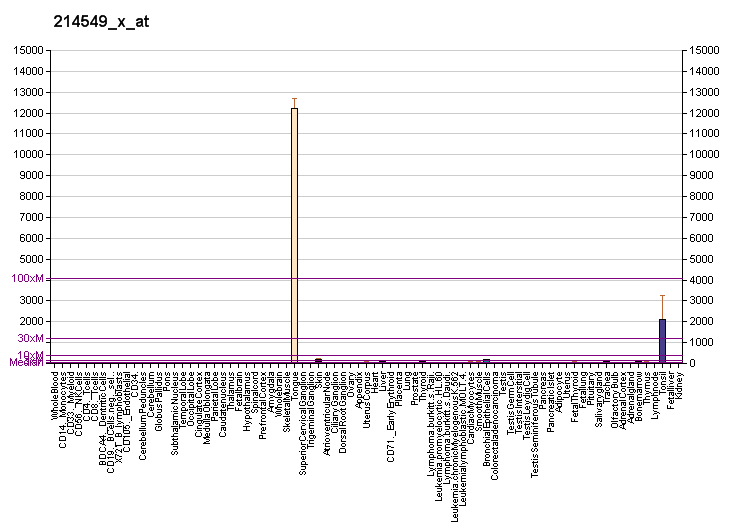

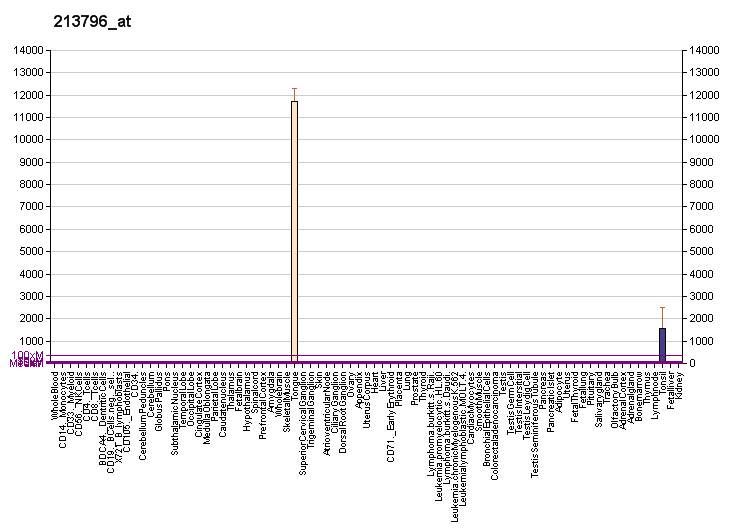
RNA expression pattern
Bgee	Human / Mouse (ortholog); Top expressed in: gums; gingival epithelium; mucosa of pharynx; body of tongue; human penis; buccal mucosa cell; oral cavity; vulva; amniotic fluid; superior surface of tongue / Top expressed in: transitional epithelium of urinary bladder; lip; esophagus; pyloric antrum; mucous cell of stomach; skin of external ear; cervix; skin of back; hair follicle; skin of abdomen; More reference expression data
BioGPS	More reference expression data
Gene ontology
Molecular function	protein-macromolecule adaptor activity; protein binding; structural molecule activity; structural constituent of skin epidermis
Cellular component	cytoplasm; cornified envelope; cytosol
Biological process	peptide cross-linking; keratinization; keratinocyte differentiation; epidermis development; cornification
Sources:Amigo / QuickGO
Orthologs
Databases	NCBI: entry; OMA: entry
Species	Human	Mouse
Entrez	6698	20753
Ensembl	ENSG00000169474	ENSMUSG00000050359
UniProt	P35321	Q62266
RefSeq (mRNA)	NM_005987; NM_001199828	NM_009264
RefSeq (protein)	NP_001186757; NP_005978	NP_033290
Location (UCSC)	Chr 1: 152.98 – 152.99 Mb	Chr 3: 92.39 – 92.39 Mb
PubMed search
- Wikidata
View/Edit Human	View/Edit Mouse

Cornifin-A is a protein that in humans is encoded by the SPRR1A gene.
