= GSK484 =

Identifiers
- IUPAC name: [(3S,4R)-3-amino-4-hydroxypiperidin-1-yl]-[2-[1-(cyclopropylmethyl)indol-2-yl]-7-methoxy-1-methylbenzimidazol-5-yl]methanone
- CAS Number: 1652629-23-6
- PubChem CID: 86340175
- ChemSpider: 35033256
- ChEMBL: ChEMBL4539512

Chemical and physical data
- Formula: C_{27}H_{31}N_{5}O_{3}
- Molar mass: 473.577 g·mol^{−1}
- 3D model (JSmol): Interactive image
- SMILES: CN1C2=C(C=C(C=C2OC)C(=O)N3CC[C@H]([C@H](C3)N)O)N=C1C4=CC5=CC=CC=C5N4CC6CC6
- InChI: InChI=1S/C27H31N5O3/c1-30-25-20(11-18(13-24(25)35-2)27(34)31-10-9-23(33)19(28)15-31)29-26(30)22-12-17-5-3-4-6-21(17)32(22)14-16-7-8-16/h3-6,11-13,16,19,23,33H,7-10,14-15,28H2,1-2H3/t19-,23+/m0/s1; Key:BDYDINKSILYBOL-WMZHIEFXSA-N

GSK484 is an experimental drug which acts as a selective inhibitor of the enzyme peptidylarginine deiminase 4 (PAD4). It has antiinflammatory effects and has been researched for potential use in the treatment of various inflammatory conditions, primarily rheumatoid arthritis, but it has also been used to investigate the role of PAD4 in acute kidney injury, lung inflammation, heart muscle damage following heart attack, osteoporosis, diabetes, and some forms of cancer.

== See also ==
- AFM-30a
- BB-Cl-Amidine
- JBI-589
