= Anti–citrullinated protein antibody =

Autoantibodies

Citrulline

Arginine

Anti-citrullinated protein antibodies (ACPAs) are autoantibodies (antibodies to an individual's own proteins) that are directed against peptides and proteins that are citrullinated. They are present in the majority of patients with rheumatoid arthritis. Clinically, cyclic citrullinated peptides (CCP) are frequently used to detect these antibodies in patient serum or plasma (then referred to as anti–citrullinated peptide antibodies).

During inflammation, arginine amino acid residues can be enzymatically converted into citrulline residues in proteins such as vimentin, by a process called citrullination. If their shapes are significantly altered, the proteins may be seen as antigens by the immune system, thereby generating an immune response.

ACPAs have proved to be powerful biomarkers that allow the diagnosis of rheumatoid arthritis (RA) to be made at a very early stage. In July 2010, the 2010 ACR/EULAR Rheumatoid Arthritis Classification Criteria were introduced. These new classification criteria include ACPA testing, and overruled the "old" ACR criteria of 1987 and are adapted for early RA diagnosis.

== History ==
The presence of autoantibodies against citrullinated proteins in rheumatoid arthritis patients was first described in the mid-1970s when the biochemical basis of antibody reactivity against keratin and filaggrin was investigated. Subsequent studies demonstrated that autoantibodies from RA patients react with a series of different citrullinated antigens, including fibrinogen, deiminated Epstein–Barr virus nuclear antigen 1 and vimentin, which is a member of the intermediate filament family of proteins. Several assays for detecting ACPAs were developed in the following years, employing mutated citrullinated Vimentin (MCV-assay), filaggrin-derived peptides (CCP-assay) and viral citrullinated peptides (VCP-assay).

A 2006 clinical study showed that anti viral citrullinated peptide (VCP) antibodies of the IgG and IgA isotypes represent a discriminating specific marker of rheumatoid arthritis from other chronic arthritides and disease controls, suggesting an independent production of each isotype. In 2010, ACPA testing has become substantial part of The 2010 ACR-EULAR classification criteria for rheumatoid arthritis.

== Clinical significance ==
In a comparative study (in 2007), various detection kits had a sensitivity between 69.6% and 77.5% and a specificity between 87.8% and 96.4%. Despite the excellent performance of these immunoassays, for example CCP-assays, they only provide a sensitivity comparable with that of rheumatoid factor (RF). Moreover, analysis of the correlation of anti-CCP antibody titre with RA disease activity yielded conflicting results.

However, novel test systems utilizing ACPA have been developed. Citrullinated vimentin is a very promising autoantigen in RA, and a suitable tool for studying this systemic autoimmune disease. Vimentin is secreted and citrullinated by macrophages in response to apoptosis, or by pro-inflammatory cytokines, such as tumor necrosis factor-alpha (TNF-alpha). A newly developed ELISA system utilises genetically modified citrullinated vimentin (MCV), a naturally occurring isoform of vimentin to optimize the performance of the test. Noteworthy are the findings of a recently published study that highly valuates anti-MCV test systems for diagnosing rheumatoid arthritis in anti-CCP-negative patients. However, data from all around the world vary substantially. Anti-CCP is also very useful in the early diagnosis of rheumatoid arthritis in high-risk groups, such as relatives of RA patients, although Silman and co-workers found that the concordance rate of developing RA was 15.4% among identical (monozygotic) twins and was 3.6% among fraternal (dizygotic) twins.

Given that ACPA are more specific than rheumatoid factor, they are used to distinguish various causes of arthritis. Novel assays may be useful for monitoring disease activity and effects of RA therapy.

The reference ranges for blood tests of anti–citrullinated protein antibodies are:

Negative	Low/weak positive	Moderate positive	High/strong positive	Unit
< 20	20–39	40–59	> 60	EU

Anti-CCP is part of the 2010 ACR/EULAR classification criteria for Rheumatoid Arthritis. Anti-CCP positivity is also a good prognostic marker for future radiographic damage, and possibly a marker to B-cell therapy responses including rituximab.

Combination of anti-CCP with other serological markers like rheumatoid factor, 14-3-3η (YWHAH) not only enhances the diagnostic capture rate but together with acute phase reactants either in early disease or at the time of diagnosis may be useful in predicting future outcomes.

== Other ACPAs and citrullinated targets in RA ==
Vimentin, fibrin, filaggrin, enolase and keratin are common citrullination targets. The list of proteins that undergo citrullination and make up the citrullinome continues to increase. The RA associated citrullinome has been reported to include targets from synovial fluid and tissue that range from proteases, receptors, and carrier proteins. These proteins are components of complement, proteolytic activity, cell recognition, endocytosis, and response to biotic stimuli amongst others. 14-3-3η (YWHAH) is also another synovial derived protein that has been reported as a citrullination target.
