= TGM3 =

Protein-coding gene in the species Homo sapiens

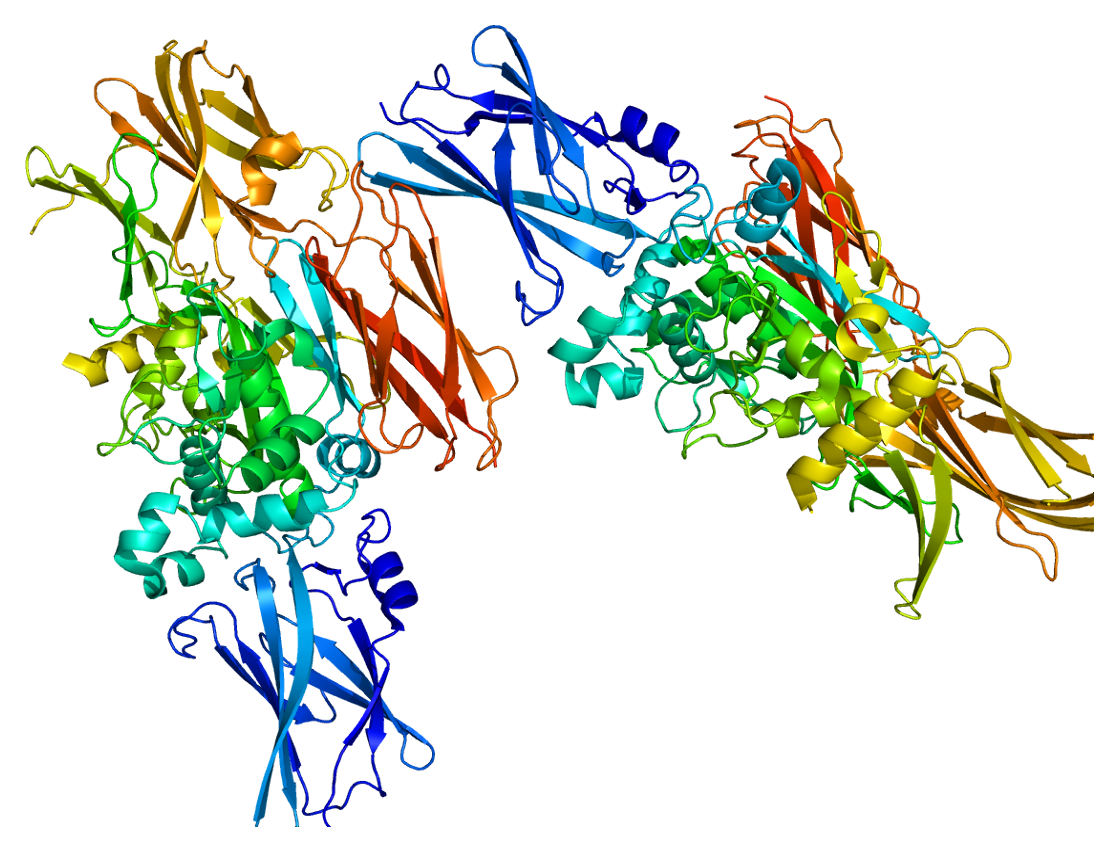

Identifiers
- Aliases: TGM3, TGE, transglutaminase 3, UHS2
- External IDs: OMIM: 600238; MGI: 98732; GeneCards: TGM3
Available structures
PDB	Ortholog search: PDBe RCSB
PDB	List of PDB id codes 1L9M, 1L9N, 1NUD, 1NUF, 1NUG
Enzyme activity
EC #	BRENDA	ExPASy	KEGG	MetaCyc
2.3.2.13	↗	↗	↗	↗

Gene location (Human)
Chr.	Chromosome 20 (human)
Band	20p13	Start	2,296,001 bp
Band	20p13	End	2,341,079 bp

Gene location (Mouse)
Chr.	Chromosome 2 (mouse)
Band	2|2 F1	Start	129,854,269 bp
Band	2|2 F1	End	129,892,319 bp
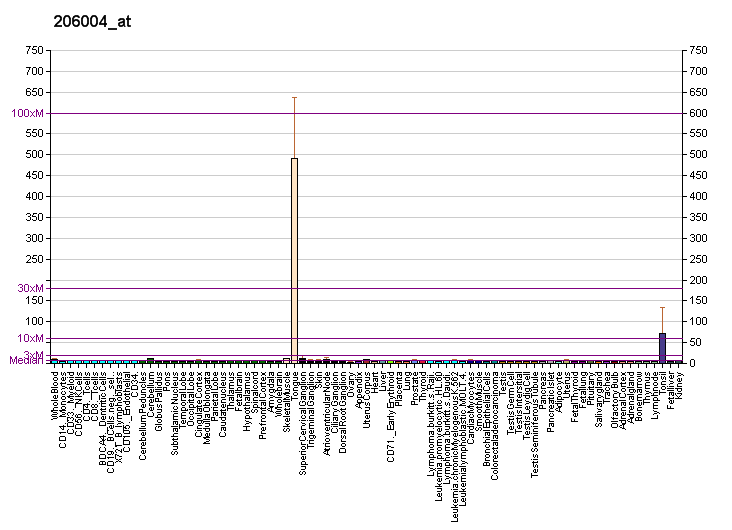
RNA expression pattern
Bgee	Human / Mouse (ortholog); Top expressed in: skin of leg; skin of abdomen; right uterine tube; tonsil; minor salivary glands; vagina; ectocervix; gallbladder; blood; granulocyte / Top expressed in: esophagus; left colon; lip; superior surface of tongue; granulocyte; hair follicle; skin of back; skin of abdomen; trachea; pretectal area; More reference expression data
BioGPS	More reference expression data
Gene ontology
Molecular function	metal ion binding; calcium ion binding; catalytic activity; protein-glutamine gamma-glutamyltransferase activity; transferase activity; acyltransferase activity
Cellular component	extrinsic component of cytoplasmic side of plasma membrane; extracellular exosome; cytoplasm
Biological process	keratinization; protein tetramerization; hair follicle morphogenesis; cell envelope organization; peptide cross-linking; keratinocyte differentiation
Sources:Amigo / QuickGO
Orthologs
Databases	NCBI: entry; OMA: entry
Species	Human	Mouse
Entrez	7053	21818
Ensembl	ENSG00000125780	ENSMUSG00000027401
UniProt	Q08188	Q08189
RefSeq (mRNA)	NM_003245	NM_009374
RefSeq (protein)	NP_003236	NP_033400
Location (UCSC)	Chr 20: 2.3 – 2.34 Mb	Chr 2: 129.85 – 129.89 Mb
PubMed search
- Wikidata
View/Edit Human	View/Edit Mouse

Protein-glutamine gamma-glutamyltransferase E is an enzyme that in humans is encoded by the TGM3 gene.

Transglutaminases are enzymes that catalyze the crosslinking of proteins by epsilon-gamma glutamyl lysine isopeptide bonds. While the primary structure of transglutaminases is not conserved, they all have the same amino acid sequence at their active sites and their activity is calcium-dependent. The protein encoded by this gene consists of two polypeptide chains activated from a single precursor protein by proteolysis. The encoded protein is involved the later stages of cell envelope formation in the epidermis and hair follicle.
