= Arginine deiminase =

Class of enzymes

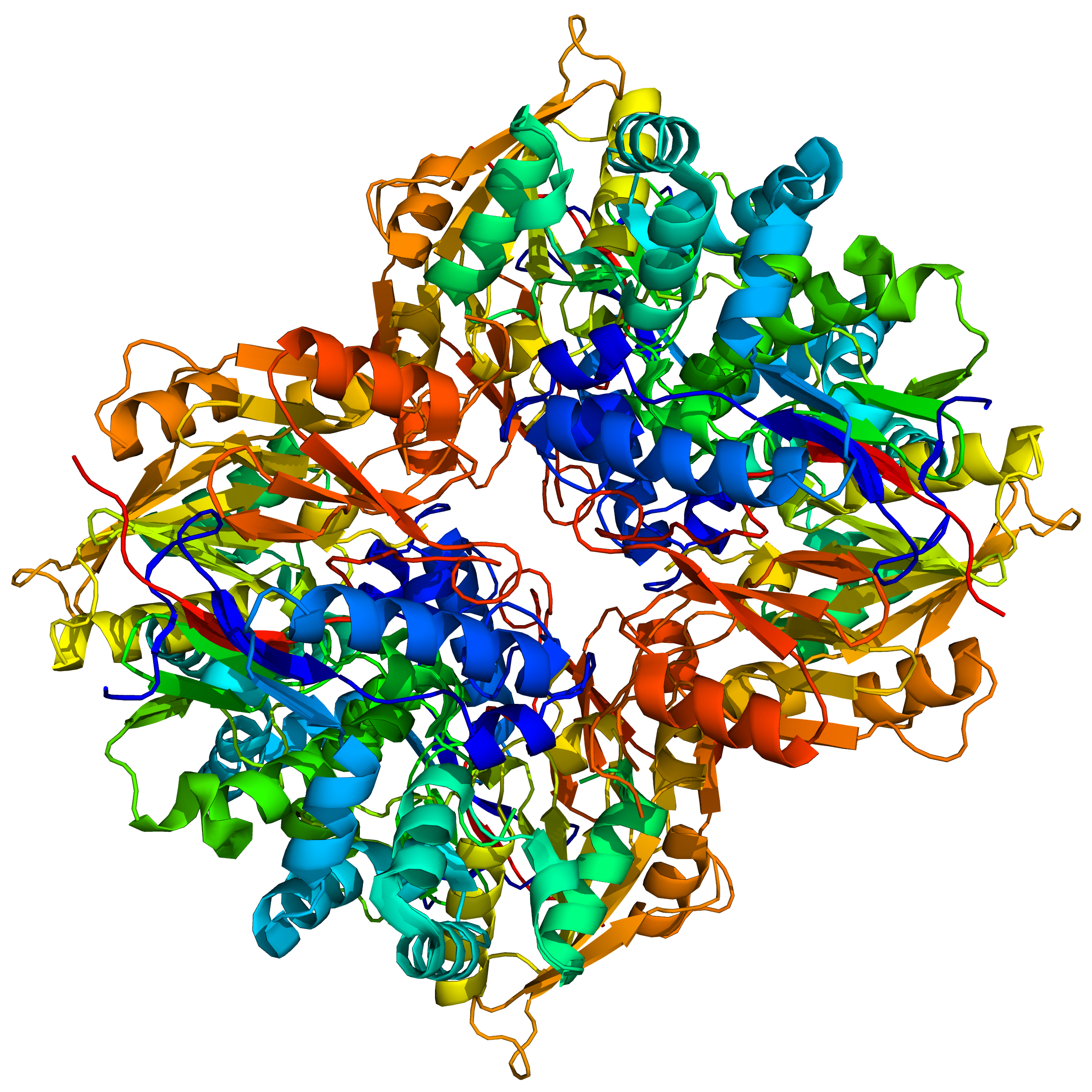

Identifiers
- EC no.: 3.5.3.6
- CAS no.: 9027-98-9

Databases
- BRENDA: enzyme data
- ExPASy: NiceZyme view
- KEGG: enzyme entry
- MetaCyc: metabolic pathway
- Rhea: reactions
- PDB structures: RCSB PDB PDBe PDBsum
- Gene Ontology: AmiGO / QuickGO
Search
- PMC: articles
- PubMed: articles
- NCBI: proteins

Arginine deiminase (EC 3.5.3.6) is an enzyme characterised from Streptococcus species that catalyzes the hydrolysis of the amino acid, arginine, to citrulline and ammonia:

arginine
H_{2}O
NH_{3}
citrulline

In murine cytotoxic macrophages, this reaction leads to the production of nitrite. The enzyme has been studied as an anti-tumor drug.

This enzyme is a hydrolase, one acting on carbon-nitrogen bonds other than peptide bonds, specifically in linear amidines. The systematic name of this enzyme class is L-arginine iminohydrolase. Other names in common use include arginine dihydrolase, citrulline iminase, and L-arginine deiminase. This enzyme participates in arginine and proline metabolism. This enzyme is widely expressed in bacteria, including streptococcus and actinomyces. The bacterial arginine deiminase expression could be regulated by various environmental factors.

In 2018, a similar enzyme, arginine dihydrolase (EC 3.5.3.27), that catalyzes the hydrolysis of arginine to ornithine, with carbon dioxide and two equivalents of ammonia as byproducts, was discovered:

arginine
2 H_{2}O
2 NH_{3}
ornithine
+ CO_{2}

== Structural studies ==
As of late 2007, 7 structures have been solved for this class of enzymes, with PDB accession codes PDB: 1LXY, PDB: 1RXX, PDB: 1S9R, PDB: 2A9G, PDB: 2AAF, PDB: 2ABR, and PDB: 2ACI.
