= Involucrin =

Protein found in humans

IVL
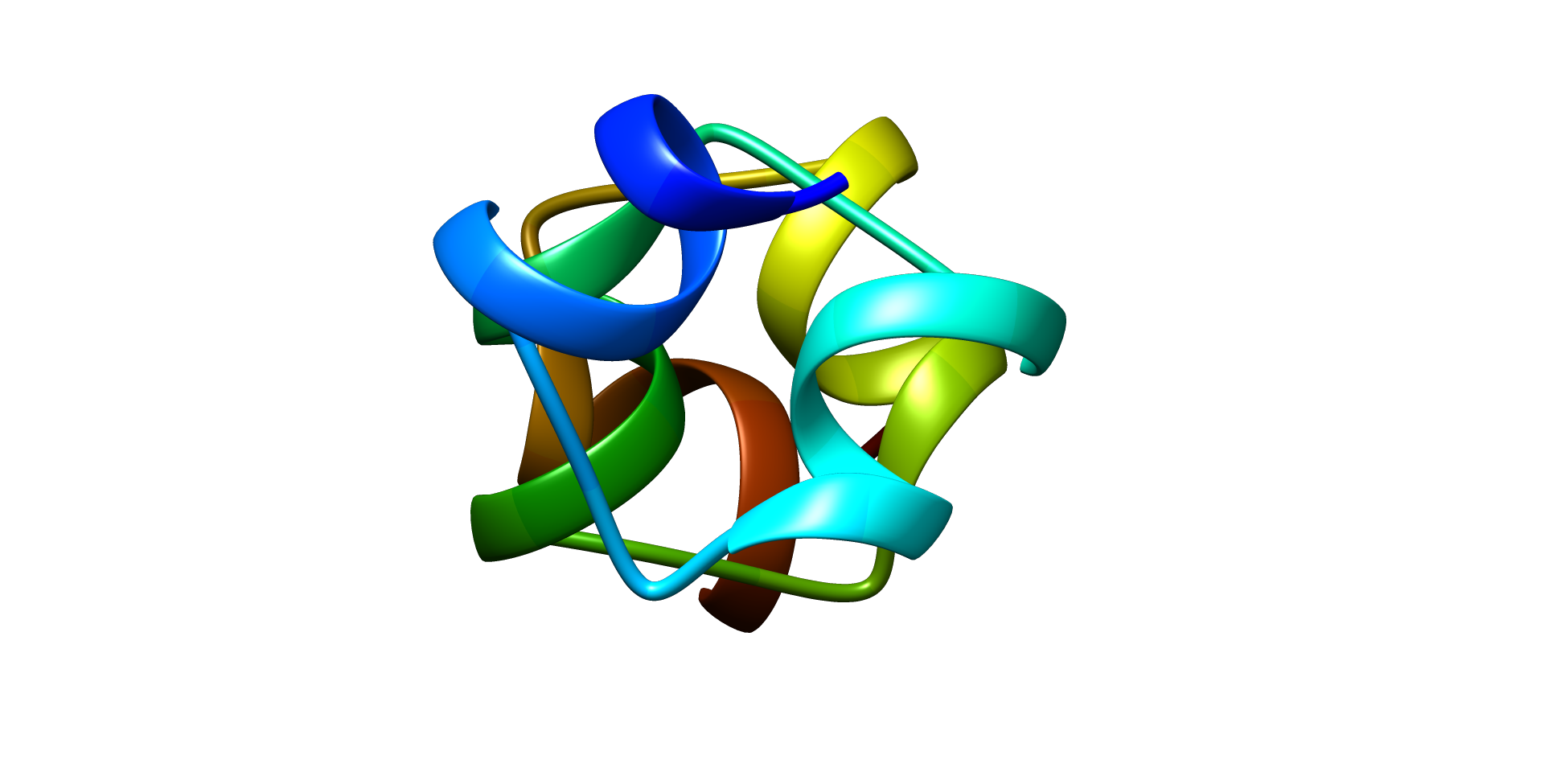

Identifiers
- Aliases: IVL, involucrin
- External IDs: OMIM: 147360; MGI: 96626; GeneCards: IVL
Available structures
PDB	Ortholog search: PDBe RCSB
PDB	List of PDB id codes 1EU0

Gene location (Human)
Chr.	Chromosome 1 (human)
Band	1q21.3	Start	152,908,546 bp
Band	1q21.3	End	152,911,886 bp

Gene location (Mouse)
Chr.	Chromosome 3 (mouse)
Band	3 F1|3 40.14 cM	Start	92,478,209 bp
Band	3 F1|3 40.14 cM	End	92,481,042 bp
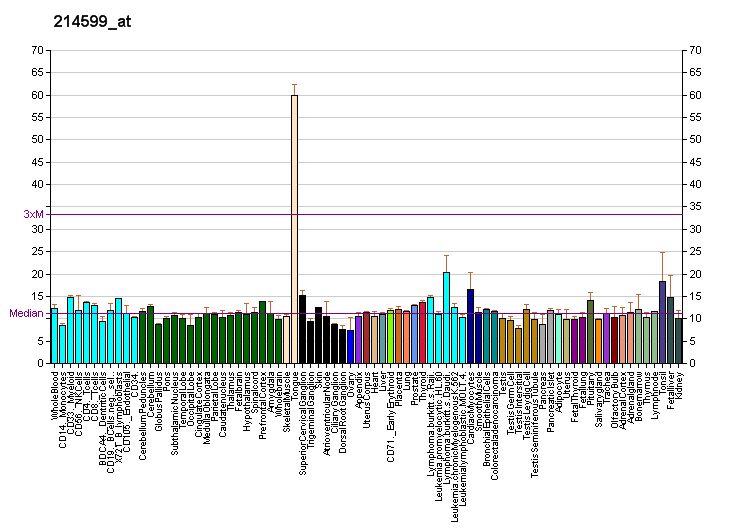
RNA expression pattern
Bgee	Human / Mouse (ortholog); Top expressed in: gingival epithelium; oral cavity; skin of abdomen; skin of leg; vulva; skin of thigh; mucosa of pharynx; testicle; amniotic fluid; human penis / Top expressed in: transitional epithelium of urinary bladder; skin of external ear; skin of back; umbilical cord; lip; skin of abdomen; epidermis; granular layer of epidermis; hair follicle; condyle; More reference expression data
BioGPS	More reference expression data
Gene ontology
Molecular function	protein-macromolecule adaptor activity; protein binding; structural molecule activity
Cellular component	cytoplasm; extracellular exosome; cornified envelope; centrosome; cytosol; nuclear body
Biological process	response to UV-B; peptide cross-linking; keratinization; isopeptide cross-linking via N6-(L-isoglutamyl)-L-lysine; keratinocyte differentiation; cornification
Sources:Amigo / QuickGO
Orthologs
Databases	NCBI: entry; OMA: entry
Species	Human	Mouse
Entrez	3713	16447
Ensembl	ENSG00000163207	ENSMUSG00000049128
UniProt	P07476	P48997
RefSeq (mRNA)	NM_005547	NM_008412
RefSeq (protein)	NP_005538	NP_032438
Location (UCSC)	Chr 1: 152.91 – 152.91 Mb	Chr 3: 92.48 – 92.48 Mb
PubMed search
- Wikidata
View/Edit Human	View/Edit Mouse

Involucrin of squamous epithelia N-terminus

Identifiers
- Symbol: Involucrin_N
- Pfam: PF10583
- InterPro: IPR019571
Available protein structures:
- PDB: IPR019571 PF10583 (ECOD; PDBsum)
- AlphaFold: IPR019571; PF10583

Involucrin repeat

Identifiers
- Symbol: Involucrin
- Pfam: PF00904
- InterPro: IPR000354
- SCOP2: 1eu0 / SCOPe / SUPFAM
Available protein structures:
- PDB: IPR000354 PF00904 (ECOD; PDBsum)
- AlphaFold: IPR000354; PF00904

Involucrin repeat

Identifiers
- Symbol: Involucrin2
- Pfam: PF06994
- InterPro: IPR009733
Available protein structures:
- PDB: IPR009733 PF06994 (ECOD; PDBsum)
- AlphaFold: IPR009733; PF06994

Involucrin is a protein component of human skin and in humans is encoded by the IVL gene. In binding the protein loricrin, involucrin contributes to the formation of a cell envelope that protects corneocytes in the skin.

== Gene ==
This gene is mapped to 1q21, among calpactin I light chain, trichohyalin, profillaggrin, loricrin, and calcyclin.

== Function ==
Involucrin is a highly reactive, soluble, transglutaminase substrate protein present in keratinocytes of epidermis and other stratified squamous epithelia. It first appears in the cell cytosol, but ultimately becomes cross-linked to membrane proteins by transglutaminase thus helping in the formation of an insoluble envelope beneath the plasma membrane functioning as a glutamyl donor during assembly of the cornified envelope.

Involucrin is synthesised in the stratum spinosum and cross linked in the stratum granulosum by the transglutaminase enzyme that makes it highly stable. Thus it provides structural support to the cell, thereby allowing the cell to resist invasion by micro-organisms.

Apigenin, a plant-derived flavanoid that has significant promise as a skin cancer chemopreventive agent, has been found to regulate normal human keratinocyte differentiation by suppressing involucrin, and this is associated with reduced cell proliferation without apoptosis.

== Clinical significance ==
As one of the precursor proteins of the cornified cell envelope, involucrin is markedly increased in inflammatory skin diseases such as psoriasis

Lamellar ichthyosis involves a decrease in expression of involucrin. This decrease could contribute to the altered desquamation process seen in the disease, since the clinical improvement associated with retinoid treatment is accompanied by increased expression of involucrin.

== Structure ==
Involucrin consists of a conserved N-terminal region of about 75 amino acid residues followed by two extremely variable length segments that contain glutamine-rich tandem repeats. The glutamine residues in the tandem repeats are the substrate for the transglutaminase in the cross-linking reaction. The total size of the protein varies from 285 residues (in dog) to 835 residues (in orangutan).
