= PADI4 =

Protein-coding gene in humans

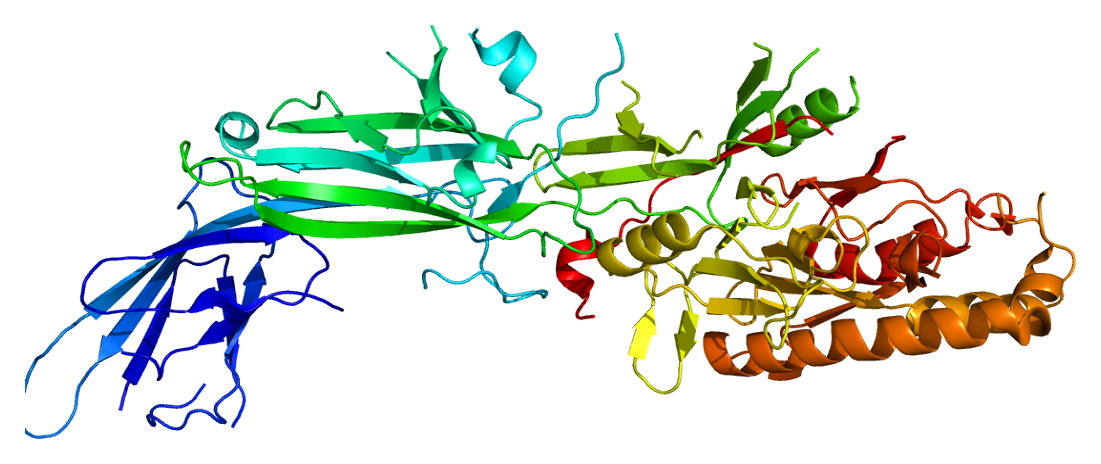

Identifiers
- Aliases: PADI4, PAD, PAD4, PADI5, PDI4, PDI5, peptidyl arginine deiminase 4
- External IDs: OMIM: 605347; MGI: 1338898; GeneCards: PADI4
Available structures
PDB	Ortholog search: PDBe RCSB
PDB	List of PDB id codes 1WD8, 1WD9, 1WDA, 2DEW, 2DEX, 2DEY, 2DW5, 3APM, 3APN, 3B1T, 3B1U, 4DKT, 4X8C, 4X8G
Enzyme activity
EC #	BRENDA	ExPASy	KEGG	MetaCyc
3.5.3.15	↗	↗	↗	↗

Gene location (Human)
Chr.	Chromosome 1 (human)
Band	1p36.13	Start	17,308,195 bp
Band	1p36.13	End	17,364,004 bp

Gene location (Mouse)
Chr.	Chromosome 4 (mouse)
Band	4 D3|4 72.34 cM	Start	140,473,176 bp
Band	4 D3|4 72.34 cM	End	140,501,547 bp
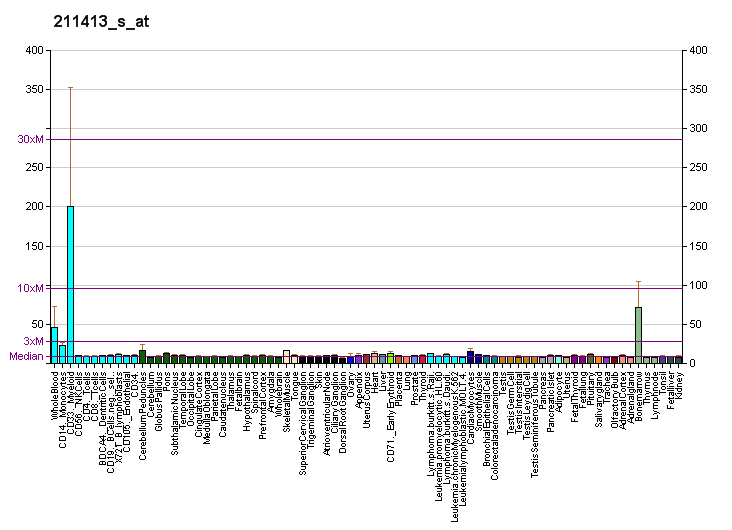

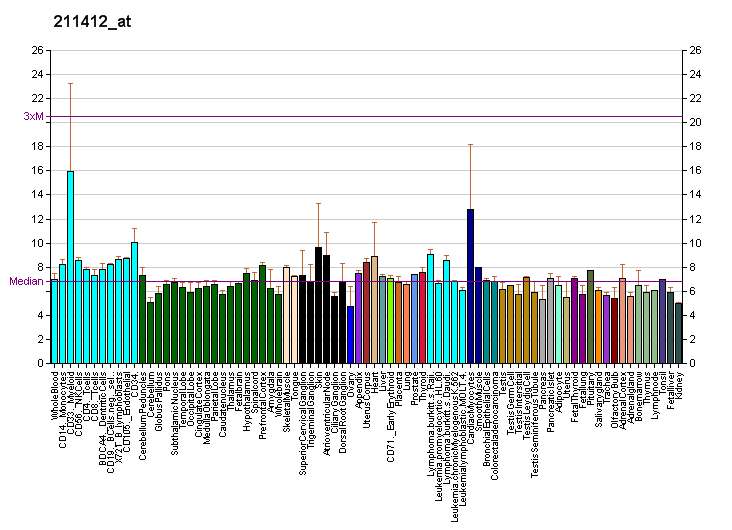

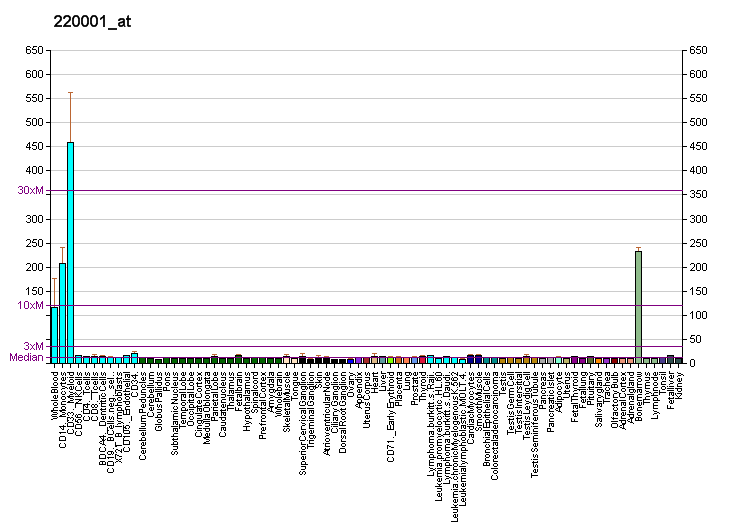
RNA expression pattern
Bgee	Human / Mouse (ortholog); Top expressed in: blood; bone marrow; bone marrow cell; monocyte; granulocyte; spleen; upper lobe of left lung; testicle; right lung; gonad / Top expressed in: granulocyte; morula; lip; hair follicle; tibiofemoral joint; cervix; bone marrow; otic vesicle; embryo; blood; More reference expression data
BioGPS	More reference expression data
Gene ontology
Molecular function	metal ion binding; arginine deiminase activity; protein binding; hydrolase activity; protein-arginine deiminase activity; calcium ion binding; arginine binding; protein homodimerization activity
Cellular component	nucleoplasm; nucleus; cytosol; cytoplasm; protein-containing complex
Biological process	chromatin remodeling; nucleosome assembly; regulation of transcription, DNA-templated; immune system process; transcription, DNA-templated; stem cell population maintenance; innate immune response; chromatin organization; arginine deiminase pathway
Sources:Amigo / QuickGO
Orthologs
Databases	NCBI: entry; OMA: entry
Species	Human	Mouse
Entrez	23569	18602
Ensembl	ENSG00000280908; ENSG00000159339	ENSMUSG00000025330
UniProt	Q9UM07	Q9Z183
RefSeq (mRNA)	NM_012387	NM_011061
RefSeq (protein)	NP_036519	NP_035191
Location (UCSC)	Chr 1: 17.31 – 17.36 Mb	Chr 4: 140.47 – 140.5 Mb
PubMed search
- Wikidata
View/Edit Human	View/Edit Mouse

Protein-arginine deiminase type-4 is a human protein which in humans is encoded by the PADI4 gene. The protein as an enzyme, specifically protein-arginine deiminase, a type of hydrolase.

== Molecular biology ==
The human gene is found on the short arm of Chromosome 1 near the telomere (1p36.13). It is located on the Watson (plus) strand and is 55,806 bases long. The protein is 663 amino acids long with a molecular weight of 74,095 Da.

== Function ==
This gene is a member of a gene family which encodes enzymes responsible for the conversion of arginine to citrulline residues (citrullination). This gene may play a role in granulocyte and macrophage development leading to inflammation and immune response. PADI4 plays a role in the epigenetics, the deimination of arginines on histones H3 and H4 can act antagonistically to arginine methylation.

The protein may be found in oligomers and binds 5 calcium ions per subunit. It catalyses the reaction:

- Protein L-arginine + H_{2}O = protein L-citrulline + NH_{4}^{+}

== Subcellular and tissue distribution ==
It is normally found in the cytoplasm, nucleus and in cytoplasmic granules of eosinophils and neutrophils. It is not expressed in peripheral monocytes or lymphocytes. It is also expressed in rheumatoid arthritis synovial tissues.
