= PADI2 =

Protein-coding gene in humans

Identifiers
- Aliases: PADI2, PAD-H19, PAD2, PDI2, peptidyl arginine deiminase 2
- External IDs: OMIM: 607935; MGI: 1338892; GeneCards: PADI2
Available structures
PDB	Ortholog search: PDBe RCSB
PDB	List of PDB id codes 4N20, 4N22, 4N24, 4N25, 4N26, 4N28, 4N2A, 4N2B, 4N2C, 4N2D, 4N2E, 4N2F, 4N2G, 4N2H, 4N2I, 4N2K, 4N2L, 4N2M, 4N2N
Enzyme activity
EC #	BRENDA	ExPASy	KEGG	MetaCyc
3.5.3.15	↗	↗	↗	↗

Gene location (Human)
Chr.	Chromosome 1 (human)
Band	1p36.13	Start	17,066,761 bp
Band	1p36.13	End	17,119,451 bp

Gene location (Mouse)
Chr.	Chromosome 4 (mouse)
Band	4 D3|4 73.01 cM	Start	140,633,655 bp
Band	4 D3|4 73.01 cM	End	140,679,897 bp
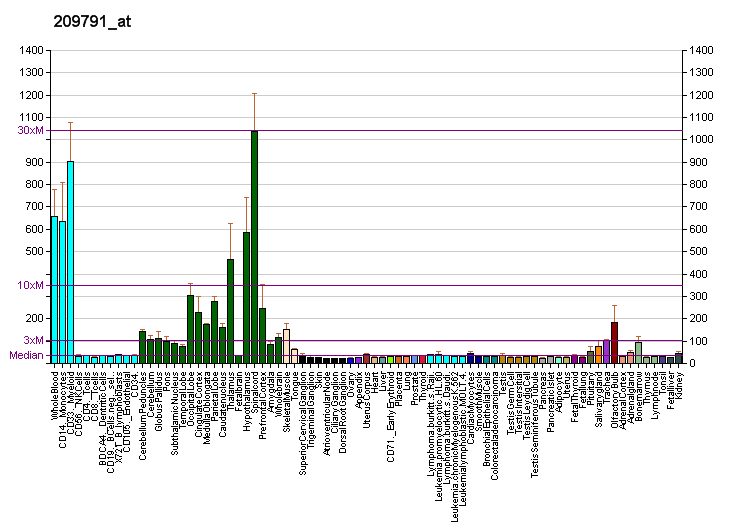
RNA expression pattern
Bgee	Human / Mouse (ortholog); Top expressed in: internal globus pallidus; C1 segment; glutes; inferior olivary nucleus; inferior ganglion of vagus nerve; middle frontal gyrus; external globus pallidus; subthalamic nucleus; gastrocnemius muscle; tibialis anterior muscle / Top expressed in: vestibular membrane of cochlear duct; decidua; gastrula; saccule; lacrimal gland; digastric muscle; retinal pigment epithelium; sternocleidomastoid muscle; stria vascularis; vestibular sensory epithelium; More reference expression data
BioGPS	More reference expression data
Gene ontology
Molecular function	calcium ion binding; estrogen receptor binding; hydrolase activity; protein-arginine deiminase activity; protein homodimerization activity; metal ion binding
Cellular component	extracellular exosome; cytoplasm; cytosol; extracellular region; nucleus; azurophil granule lumen
Biological process	negative regulation of chemokine-mediated signaling pathway; substantia nigra development; intracellular estrogen receptor signaling pathway; negative regulation of lymphocyte chemotaxis; chromatin organization; neutrophil degranulation; cellular response to leukemia inhibitory factor
Sources:Amigo / QuickGO
Orthologs
Databases	NCBI: entry; OMA: entry
Species	Human	Mouse
Entrez	11240	18600
Ensembl	ENSG00000117115	ENSMUSG00000028927
UniProt	Q9Y2J8	Q08642
RefSeq (mRNA)	NM_007365	NM_008812
RefSeq (protein)	NP_031391	NP_032838
Location (UCSC)	Chr 1: 17.07 – 17.12 Mb	Chr 4: 140.63 – 140.68 Mb
PubMed search
- Wikidata
View/Edit Human	View/Edit Mouse

Protein-arginine deiminase type-2 is an enzyme that in humans is encoded by the PADI2 gene.

This gene encodes a member of the peptidyl arginine deiminase family of enzymes, which catalyze the post-translational deimination of proteins by converting arginine residues into citrullines in the presence of calcium ions. The family members have distinct substrate specificities and tissue-specific expression patterns. The type II enzyme is the most widely expressed family member. Known substrates for this enzyme include myelin basic protein in the central nervous system and vimentin in skeletal muscle and macrophages.

This enzyme is thought to play a role in the onset and progression of neurodegenerative human disorders, including Alzheimer's disease and multiple sclerosis, and it has also been implicated in glaucoma pathogenesis. This gene exists in a cluster with four other paralogous genes.
