= Filaggrin =

Protein found in humans

FLG
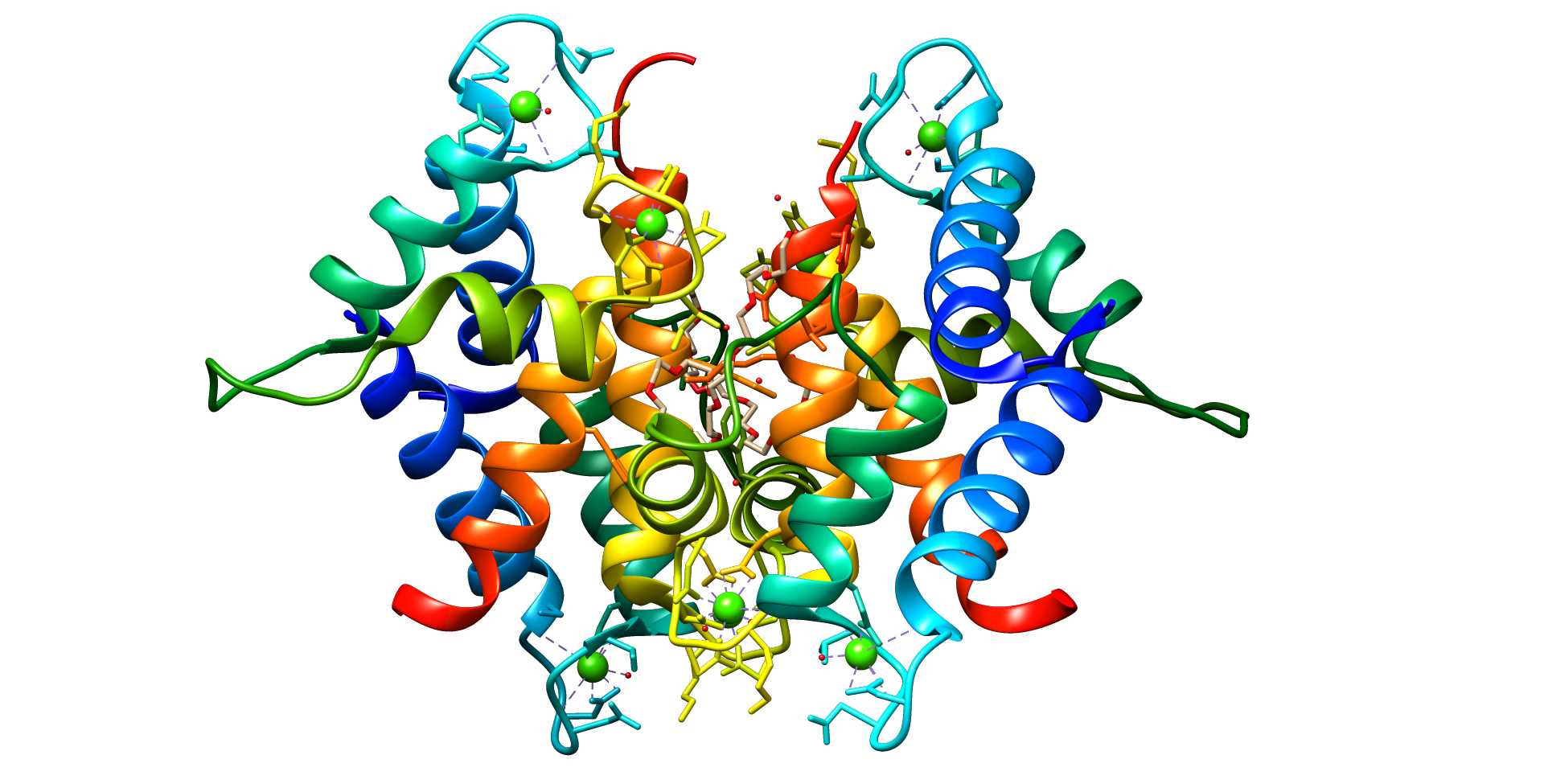

Identifiers
- Aliases: FLG, ATOD2, filaggrin
- External IDs: OMIM: 135940; GeneCards: FLG
Available structures
PDB	Human UniProt search: PDBe RCSB
PDB	List of PDB id codes 4PCW

Gene location (Human)
Chr.	Chromosome 1 (human)
Band	1q21.3	Start	152,302,165 bp
Band	1q21.3	End	152,325,239 bp
RNA expression pattern
Bgee	Human / Mouse (ortholog); Top expressed in: skin of thigh; skin of arm; skin of hip; human penis; vulva; nipple; skin of abdomen; epithelium of esophagus; oral cavity; amniotic fluid / n/a; More reference expression data
BioGPS	n/a
Gene ontology
Molecular function	calcium ion binding; protein binding; structural molecule activity; metal ion binding; transition metal ion binding; structural constituent of skin epidermis
Cellular component	intermediate filament; keratohyalin granule; intracellular membrane-bounded organelle; nucleus; cytosol; cornified envelope; collagen-containing extracellular matrix
Biological process	multicellular organism development; keratinocyte differentiation; establishment of skin barrier; cornification; peptide cross-linking
Sources:Amigo / QuickGO
Orthologs
Databases	NCBI: entry; OMA: entry
Species	Human	Mouse
Entrez	2312	n/a
Ensembl	ENSG00000143631	n/a
UniProt	P20930	n/a
RefSeq (mRNA)	NM_002016	n/a
RefSeq (protein)	NP_002007	n/a
Location (UCSC)	Chr 1: 152.3 – 152.33 Mb	n/a
PubMed search		n/a
- Wikidata
View/Edit Human

Filaggrin (filament aggregating protein; FLG) is a filament-associated protein that binds to keratin fibers in epithelial cells. Ten to twelve filaggrin units are post-translationally hydrolyzed from a large profilaggrin precursor protein during terminal differentiation of epidermal cells. In humans, profilaggrin is encoded by the FLG gene, which is part of the S100 fused-type protein (SFTP) family within the epidermal differentiation complex on chromosome 1q21. In cetaceans and sirenians, the FLG family has lost its function, with the curious exception of manatees in the latter clade: manatees still retain some functional FLG genes.

== Profilaggrin ==
Filaggrin monomers are tandemly clustered into a large, 350kDa protein precursor known as profilaggrin. In the epidermis, these structures are present in the keratohyalin granules in cells of the stratum granulosum. Profilaggrin undergoes proteolytic processing to yield individual filaggrin monomers at the transition between the stratum granulosum and the stratum corneum, which may be facilitated by calcium-dependent enzymes.

== Structure ==
Filaggrin is characterized by a particularly high isoelectric point due to the relatively high presence of histidine in its primary structure. It is also relatively low in the sulfur-containing amino acids methionine and cysteine.

== Function ==
Filaggrin is essential for the regulation of epidermal homeostasis. Within the stratum corneum, filaggrin monomers can become incorporated into the lipid envelope, which is responsible for the skin barrier function. Alternatively, these proteins can interact with keratin intermediate filaments. Filaggrin undergoes further processing in the upper stratum corneum to release free amino acids that assist in water retention.

Some studies attribute an important role to filaggrin in maintaining the physiological acidic pH of the skin, through a breaking-down mechanism to form histidine and subsequently trans-urocanic acid. However, others have shown that the filaggrin–histidine–urocanic acid cascade is not essential for skin acidification.

== Clinical significance ==
Individuals with truncation mutations in the gene coding for filaggrin are strongly predisposed to a severe form of dry skin, ichthyosis vulgaris, and/or eczema.

It has been shown that almost 50% of all severe cases of eczema may have at least one mutated filaggrin gene. R501X and 2284del4 are not generally found in non-Caucasian individuals, though novel mutations (3321delA and S2554X) that yield similar effects have been found in Japanese populations. Truncation mutations R501X and 2284del4 are the most common mutations in the Caucasian population, with 7–10% of the Caucasian population carrying at least one copy of these mutations.

Autoantibodies in rheumatoid arthritis recognizing an epitope of citrullinated peptides are cross-reactive with filaggrin.

The barrier defect seen in filaggrin null carriers also appears to lead to increased asthma susceptibility and exacerbations. Filaggrin deficiency is one of the top genome-wide genetic determinants of asthma, along with the variants found that regulate ORMDL3 expression.

In early infancy, the penetrance of filaggrin mutations may be increased by household exposure to cats.

== See also ==
- Ichthyosis vulgaris
- List of cutaneous conditions caused by mutations in keratins
