= SEPTIN9 =

Protein-coding gene in the species Homo sapiens

An Error has occurred retrieving Wikidata item for infobox Septin-9 is a protein that in humans is encoded by the SEPTIN9 gene (previously SEPT9).

== Interactions ==
SEPT9 has been shown to interact with SEPT2 and SEPT7.

== Function ==
Along with AHNAK, eIF4E and S100A11, SEPT9 has been shown to be essential for pseudopod protrusion, tumor cell migration and invasion.

== Clinical significance ==
The v2 region of the SEPT9 promoter has been shown to be methylated in colorectal cancer tissue compared with normal colonic mucosa. Using highly sensitive real time PCR assays, methylated SEPT9 was detected in the blood of colorectal cancer patients. This alternate methylation pattern in cancer samples is suggestive of an aberrant activation or repression of the gene compared to normal tissue samples.

Testing to detect methylated SEPT9 is not indicated as a first option for colorectal cancer screening. It is similar in specificity and sensitivity to the stool guaiac test or fecal immune tests, and those tests should be used in preference. In cases when the physician aggressively has recommended a colonoscopy and the patient has declined that and these other tests, then this test has advantages over patients having no screening at all.

== See also ==
- Hereditary neuralgic amyotrophy
