= MS100a7a15 =

The S100 calcium-binding protein mS100a7a15 is the murine ortholog of human S100A7 (Psoriasin) and human S100A15 (Koebnerisin). mS100a7a15 is also known as S100a15, mS100a7 and mS100a7a and is encoded by the mS100a7a gene (alias: S100a15)

S100 proteins are a diverse calcium-binding family that mediate fundamental cellular and extracellular processes including cell proliferation and differentiation, cell migration, and the antimicrobial host defense as antimicrobial peptides.

mS100a7a15 was first cloned as mS100a15 from adult mouse skin (FVB/N mice, clone RP1-128L15, accession no.: AL591704). Today, the protein is of further interest because of its role in innate immunity, epidermal cell maturation and epithelial tumorigenesis. Additionally, it can serve as surrogate model to study hS100A7 and hS100A15 functions.

== Function ==
=== Epithelial homeostasis and antimicrobial host defence ===
Skin: In new-born mouse skin, mS100a7a15 is localized to the epidermal granular and cornified layers of the interfollicular epidermis and to the maturing cells of hair follicles. In maturing keratinocytes, mS100a7a15 is induced by calcium mediated differentiation dependent on protein kinase C (PKC). It is upregulated in a TLR4 dependent manner by E. coli stimulation and might have antimicrobial effects against E. coli like its human counterparts. In the dermis, it is expressed by the smooth muscle cells of the panniculus carnosus.

Breast: mS100a7a15 is weakly expressed in normal mammary gland tissue.

=== Epithelial Carcinogenesis ===
Breast cancer: mS100a7a15 is upregulated in DMBA induced mammary gland tumors confined to epithelial tumor cells. mS100a7a15 overexpression in mammary epithelial cells enhances proliferation, angiogenesis and metastasis through induction of prometastatic and angiogenic factors like CCL2, Cox-2, MMP2, MMP9 and VEGF. Furthermore mS100a7a15 recruits tumor-associated-macrophages (TAM) through RAGE and Stat3 activation to promote tumorigenesis.

=== Inflammation ===
mS100a7a15 is upregulated in inflamed skin. TPA (12-O-Tetradecanoylphorbol-13-acetate), a potent PKC activator, induces mS100a7a15 expression. TPA induces mS100a7a15 through AP-1 but not NF-κB. Similar to psoriasin, mS100a7a15 recruits leukocytes and induces proinflammatory chemokines as well as cytokines in keratinocytes through RAGE activation as an alarmin. Similar to its human counterparts, mS100a7a15 mediates inflammation through RAGE (like psoriasin) and through an unknown receptor (like koebnerisin). A bi-transgenic mouse model (K5-tTA/TetOmS100a7a15) that expresses abundant mS100a7a15 throughout the basal epidermal layer showed an increased infiltration of CD3+ and CD4+ T lymphocytes into the skin that was associated with an increased production of Th1 and Th17 cytokines and cathelicidin/LL-37.

== Special characteristics ==
=== Genomic organization and mRNA splice variants ===
mS100a7a15 is encoded within the murine equivalent of the human EDC on chromosome 3qF1. The mouse transcript is organized in three exons and two introns, spanning an open reading frame of 327 nucleotides.

=== Protein ===
The deduced mS100a7a15 protein sequence has two helix-loop-helix motifs corresponding to the for S100 proteins typical conserved C-terminal and a variant N-terminal EF-hand calcium binding sites. The translated mS100a7a15 protein features 109 amino acids, with a calculated molecular weight of 12.87 kDa and a predicted pI of 6.18.

=== Evolution ===
The mS100a7a15 gene is encoded in a single genomic region on chromosome 3qF1 that corresponds to the human chromosome 1q21 where psoriasin (S100A7) and koebnerisin (S100A15) are encoded. This indicates that the mS100a7a15 gene is close to the ancestor of the human orthologs.
