= Psoriasin =

Psoriasin may refer to:

- Coal tar, by-product of the production of coke and coal gas from coal.
- S100A7, S100 calcium-binding protein A7.
