= Prospekta =

Nootropic drug

Prospekta is a nootropic drug reported to act on the S100 proteins. It was developed by the company Materia Medica and approved in Russia for the treatment of ADHD in 2022. It was also studied for vascular dementia.
