= S100A3 =

Protein found in humans

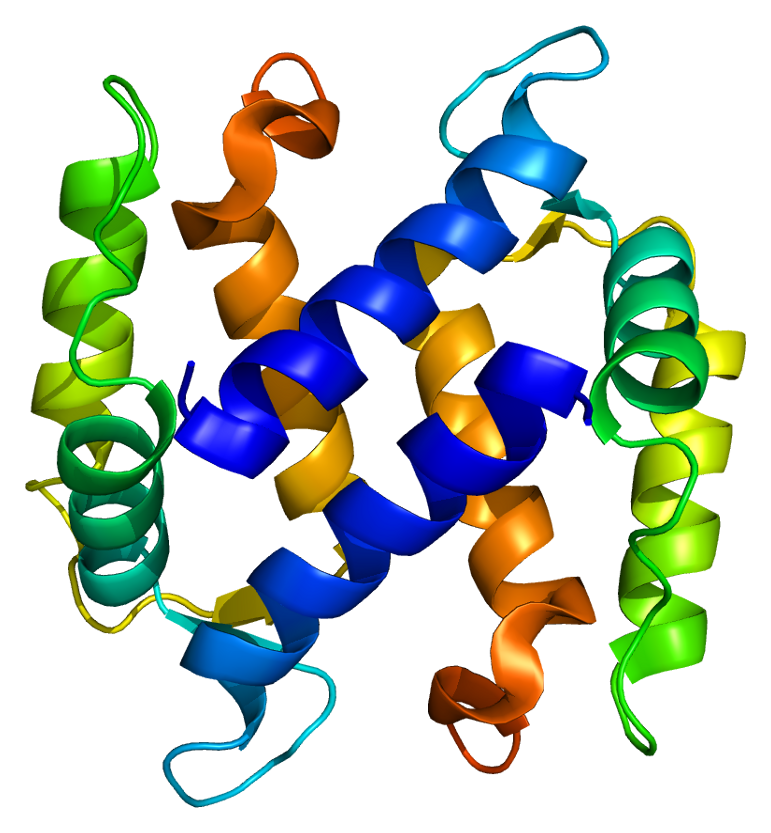

Identifiers
- Aliases: S100A3, S100E, S100 calcium binding protein A3
- External IDs: OMIM: 176992; MGI: 1338849; GeneCards: S100A3
Available structures
PDB	Ortholog search: PDBe RCSB
PDB	List of PDB id codes 1KSO, 3NSI, 3NSK, 3NSL, 3NSO

Gene location (Human)
Chr.	Chromosome 1 (human)
Band	1q21.3	Start	153,547,329 bp
Band	1q21.3	End	153,549,258 bp

Gene location (Mouse)
Chr.	Chromosome 3 (mouse)
Band	3 F1|3 39.26 cM	Start	90,491,966 bp
Band	3 F1|3 39.26 cM	End	90,510,009 bp
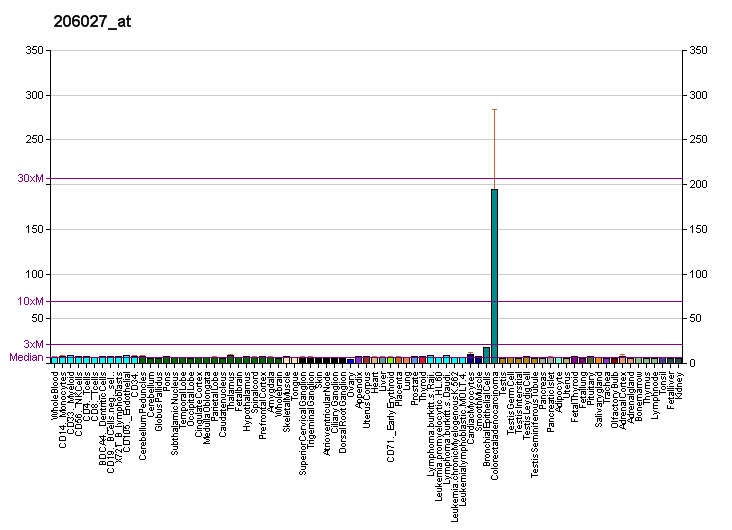
RNA expression pattern
Bgee	Human / Mouse (ortholog); Top expressed in: skin of arm; skin of leg; skin of abdomen; ectocervix; upper lobe of left lung; canal of the cervix; right coronary artery; vagina; decidua; Descending thoracic aorta / Top expressed in: lip; hair follicle; corneal stroma; embryo; morula; granulocyte; conjunctival fornix; skin of back; embryo; skin of abdomen; More reference expression data
BioGPS	More reference expression data
Orthologs
Databases	NCBI: entry; OMA: entry
Species	Human	Mouse
Entrez	6274	20197
Ensembl	ENSG00000188015	ENSMUSG00000001021
UniProt	P33764	P62818
RefSeq (mRNA)	NM_002960	NM_011310; NM_001355597; NM_001355600; NM_001355602
RefSeq (protein)	NP_002951	NP_035440; NP_001342526; NP_001342529; NP_001342531
Location (UCSC)	Chr 1: 153.55 – 153.55 Mb	Chr 3: 90.49 – 90.51 Mb
PubMed search
- Wikidata
View/Edit Human	View/Edit Mouse

S100 calcium-binding protein A3 (S100A3) is a protein that in humans is encoded by the S100A3 gene.

The protein encoded by this gene is a member of the S100 family of proteins containing 2 EF-hand calcium-binding motifs. S100 proteins are localized in the cytoplasm and/or nucleus of a wide range of cells, and involved in the regulation of a number of cellular processes such as cell cycle progression and differentiation. S100 genes include at least 13 members which are located as a cluster on chromosome 1q21. This protein has the highest content of cysteines of all S100 proteins, has a high affinity for zinc, and is highly expressed in human hair cuticle. The precise function of this protein is unknown.
