= Midkine =

Protein-coding gene in the species Homo sapiens

MDK
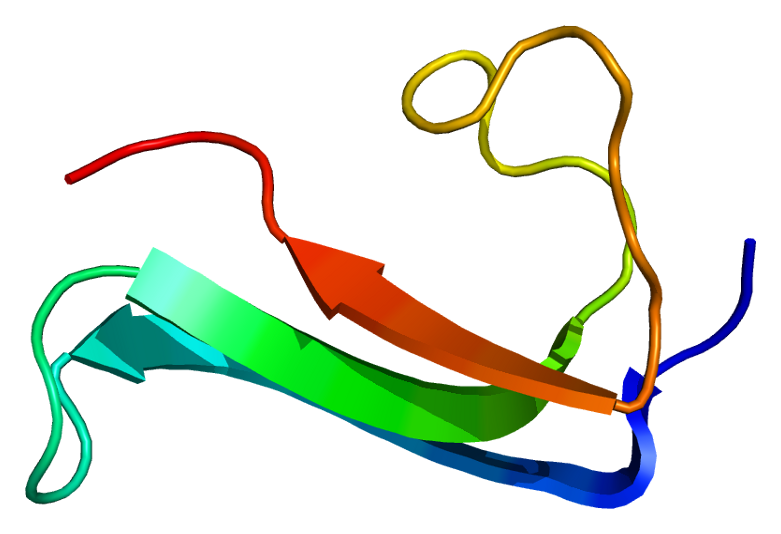

Identifiers
- Aliases: MDK, ARAP, MK, NEGF2, midkine (neurite growth-promoting factor 2), midkine
- External IDs: OMIM: 162096; MGI: 96949; GeneCards: MDK
Available structures
PDB	Ortholog search: PDBe RCSB
PDB	List of PDB id codes 1MKC, 1MKN

Gene location (Human)
Chr.	Chromosome 11 (human)
Band	11p11.2	Start	46,380,756 bp
Band	11p11.2	End	46,383,837 bp

Gene location (Mouse)
Chr.	Chromosome 2 (mouse)
Band	2 E1|2 50.63 cM	Start	91,760,150 bp
Band	2 E1|2 50.63 cM	End	91,762,642 bp
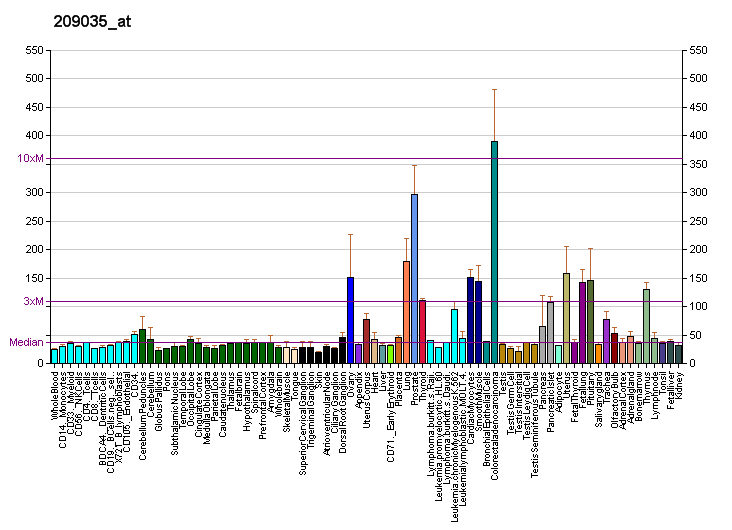
RNA expression pattern
Bgee	Human / Mouse (ortholog); Top expressed in: ventricular zone; stromal cell of endometrium; pituitary gland; left ovary; canal of the cervix; anterior pituitary; right uterine tube; ganglionic eminence; duodenum; right ovary / Top expressed in: genital tubercle; tail of embryo; ventricular zone; yolk sac; epiblast; ganglionic eminence; uterus; neural tube; embryo; embryo; More reference expression data
BioGPS	More reference expression data
Gene ontology
Molecular function	growth factor activity; heparin binding
Cellular component	cytoplasm; cell projection; extracellular region; collagen-containing extracellular matrix
Biological process	Notch signaling pathway; negative regulation of neuron apoptotic process; regulation of behavior; cerebellar granular layer development; dentate gyrus development; response to glucocorticoid; behavioral fear response; nervous system development; positive regulation of transcription, DNA-templated; multicellular organism development; defecation; short-term memory; cerebral cortex development; response to hormone; cell migration; hippocampus development; positive regulation of cell division; signal transduction; negative regulation of neuron death; response to wounding; adrenal gland development; cell differentiation; regulation of signaling receptor activity
Sources:Amigo / QuickGO
Orthologs
Databases	NCBI: entry; OMA: entry
Species	Human	Mouse
Entrez	4192	17242
Ensembl	ENSG00000110492	ENSMUSG00000027239
UniProt	P21741	P12025
RefSeq (mRNA)	NM_001012333; NM_001012334; NM_001270550; NM_001270551; NM_001270552 NM_002391	NM_001012335; NM_001012336; NM_010784; NM_001291481; NM_001291482 NM_001291483
RefSeq (protein)	NP_001012333; NP_001012334; NP_001257479; NP_001257480; NP_001257481 NP_002382	NP_001012335; NP_001012336; NP_001278410; NP_001278411; NP_001278412 NP_034914
Location (UCSC)	Chr 11: 46.38 – 46.38 Mb	Chr 2: 91.76 – 91.76 Mb
PubMed search
- Wikidata
View/Edit Human	View/Edit Mouse

Midkine (MK or MDK), also known as neurite growth-promoting factor 2 (NEGF2), is a protein that in humans is encoded by the MDK gene.

Midkine is a basic heparin-binding growth factor of low molecular weight, and forms a family with pleiotrophin (NEGF1, 46% homologous with MK). It is a nonglycosylated protein, composed of two domains held by disulfide bridges. It is a developmentally important retinoic acid-responsive gene product strongly induced during mid-gestation, hence the name midkine. Restricted mainly to certain tissues in the normal adult, it is strongly induced during oncogenesis, inflammation and tissue repair.

MK is pleiotropic, capable of exerting activities such as cell proliferation, cell migration, angiogenesis and fibrinolysis. A molecular complex containing receptor-type tyrosine phosphatase zeta (PTPζ), low density lipoprotein receptor-related protein (LRP1), anaplastic leukemia kinase (ALK) and syndecans is considered to be its receptor.

== Role in cancer ==
MK appears to enhance the angiogenic and proliferative activities of cancer cells. The expression of MK (mRNA and protein expression) has been found to be elevated in multiple cancer types, such as neuroblastoma, glioblastoma, Wilms' tumors, thyroid papillary carcinomas, colorectal, liver, ovary, bladder, breast, lung, esophageal, stomach, and prostate cancers. Serum MK in normal individuals is usually less than 0.5-0.6 ng/ml, whereas patients with these malignancies have much higher levels than this. In some cases, these elevated levels of MK also indicate a poorer prognosis of the disease, such as in neuroblastoma, glioblastoma, and bladder carcinomas. In neuroblastoma, for example, the levels of MK are elevated about three times the level in Stage 4 of the cancer (one of the final stages) than they are in Stage 1.

In neuroblastoma, MK has been found to be over expressed in the cancer cells that are resistant to chemotherapeutic drugs. The resistance to chemotherapy seems to be reversible by administering chemo-resensitization drugs, such as verapamil, which acts not via MK alteration, but by inhibiting the P-glycoprotein pump that exports cytotoxins out of cells. Since chemotherapeutic drugs are cytotoxic, the drugs administered are also exported by this pump, rendering the chemotherapy ineffective. It has been found that when the neuroblastoma cells that are resistant to chemotherapy are grown in co-culture with the wild type (WT), or chemotherapy-sensitive cells, the resistance to chemotherapy is conferred to the wild type cells, and thus no cell death or senescence occurs in either cell type, despite the chemotherapeutic treatment. MK has been identified as one of the factors that "transfers" this chemoresistance from the resistant cells to the WT cells.

MK is a secreted protein, and is therefore found in the microenvironment (media) of the resistant neuroblastoma cells. Following co-culture experiments and the determination that MK was one of the factors that was conferring chemo-resistance to the wild, non-resistant cell type, the gene for MK was transfected into WT cells to determine if MK was overexpressed in the WT cells themselves, would the cells become resistant to chemotherapy independent of resistant cell influence. The tests further confirmed that MK specifically increased chemotherapeutic resistance in the transfected WT-MK cells versus regular WT cells, confirming the specific chemoresistant properties of MK.

In addition, the mechanism for such anti-apoptotic (anti-cell death) activity was studied, specifically using the chemotherapeutic Doxorubicin (Adriamycin) on osteosarcoma (Saos2) cells. Doxorubicin works by putting rampant cancer cells into a senescent state. MK, in WT-MK transfected cells versus WT cells, seemed to activate PKB (Akt), mTOR, and Bad protein, while it inactivated caspase-3. PKB, mTOR, and Bad are all elements associated with the cell cycle survival pathway, whereas caspase-3 is important in the apoptotic pathway (cell death). This indicates that MK caused the cells to initiate the survival pathway (via PKB, mTOR, and Bad activation) and inhibit the senescent or apoptotic pathway (via inhibiting caspase-3) encouraging the chemoresistance seen in resistant cells and in the co-culture experiments. The activation and inhibition of these particular factors clearly is maintaining the immortal quality inherent in cancer cells and specifically in the resistant cell types. Stat-3, however, which is another survival pathway factor, does not appear to have any change in activation between the wild type cells and the MK-transfected WT cells, as was initially believed from a previous study.

MK may potentially be indirectly targeted as a cancer treatment as a result of its cancerous proliferation properties. Drugs by the name of anti-cancer aptamers have been created to inhibit to proteins involved in MK's cancer cell "activation". Specifically, the extra-cellular matrix (ECM) protein nucleolin has been targeted with an aptamer that would bind nucleolin and prevent MK from being transported into cancerous cell nuclei, preventing the protein from enhancing the cancerous properties of the cell. Miyakawa et al. have successfully established the method to prepare the MDK specific RNA aptamers by the use of the recombinant midkine and pleiotrophin.

Mdk is also a tumor antigen able to induce CD8 and CD4 T cell responses (Kerzerho et al. 2010 Journal of Immunology).

== HIV infection ==
Midkine binds to cell-surface nucleolin as a low affinity receptor. This binding can inhibit HIV infection.

== Trivia ==
- In the Japanese film "L: Change the World", Midkine is used as a major plot element, as it is used in a vaccine to treat the ebola virus combined with influenza, from spreading.
