= Pleiotrophin =

Protein in humans

PTN
Available structures
PDB	Ortholog search: PDBe RCSB
PDB	List of PDB id codes 2N6F

Identifiers
- Aliases: PTN, HARP, HBGF8, HBNF, NEGF1, HB-GAM, HBBM, HBGF-8, HBNF-1, OSF-1, pleiotrophin
- External IDs: OMIM: 162095; MGI: 97804; HomoloGene: 2117; GeneCards: PTN; OMA:PTN - orthologs

Gene location (Human)
Chr.	Chromosome 7 (human)
Band	7q33	Start	137,227,341 bp
Band	7q33	End	137,343,774 bp

Gene location (Mouse)
Chr.	Chromosome 6 (mouse)
Band	6 B1|6 15.48 cM	Start	36,691,864 bp
Band	6 B1|6 15.48 cM	End	36,787,155 bp
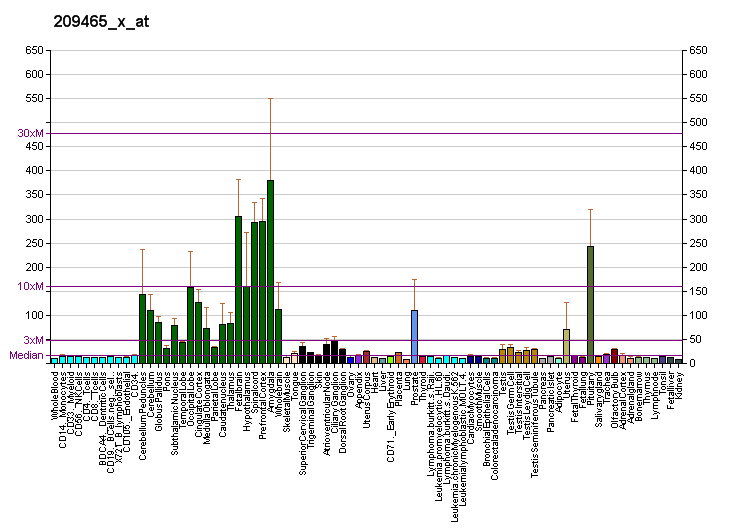

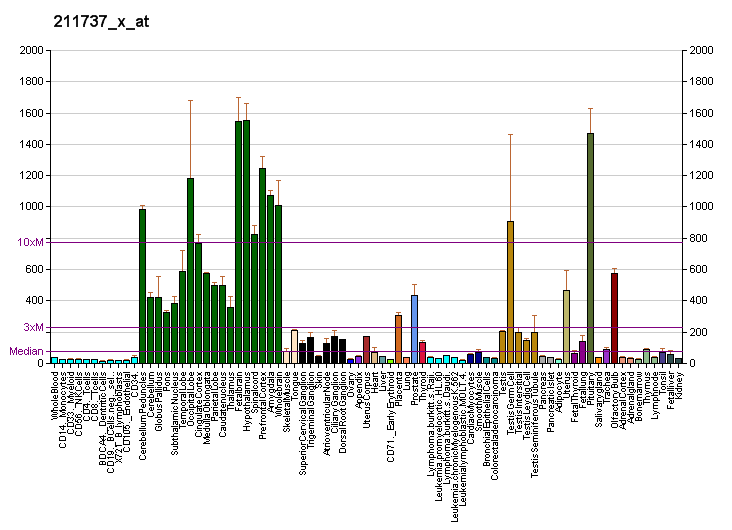

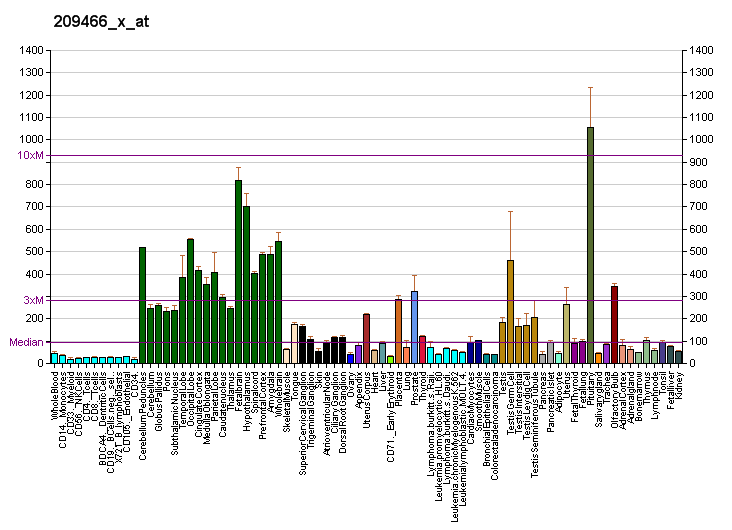
RNA expression pattern
Bgee	Human / Mouse (ortholog); Top expressed in: ventricular zone; ganglionic eminence; trigeminal ganglion; optic nerve; ventral tegmental area; amygdala; periodontal fiber; corpus callosum; nucleus accumbens; pons / Top expressed in: genital tubercle; optic nerve; efferent ductule; vestibular sensory epithelium; median eminence; Gonadal ridge; gastrula; vas deferens; abdominal wall; ventricular zone; More reference expression data
BioGPS	More reference expression data
Gene ontology
Molecular function	glycosaminoglycan binding; protein phosphatase inhibitor activity; heparan sulfate binding; heparin binding; growth factor activity; chondroitin sulfate binding; protein kinase binding; chondroitin sulfate proteoglycan binding; vascular endothelial growth factor binding; proteoglycan binding
Cellular component	cytoplasm; membrane; neuromuscular junction; basement membrane; cell surface; extracellular region; endoplasmic reticulum; perinuclear region of cytoplasm; extracellular space; protein-containing complex; presynapse; postsynapse
Biological process	positive regulation of hepatocyte proliferation; bone mineralization; response to estradiol; ossification; lung development; thalamus development; response to kainic acid; estrous cycle; cellular response to UV; negative regulation of glial cell proliferation; response to ciliary neurotrophic factor; response to progesterone; response to nerve growth factor; cellular response to organic cyclic compound; hindbrain development; cellular response to platelet-derived growth factor stimulus; cellular response to vitamin D; learning; response to activity; negative regulation of membrane potential; cerebellum development; nervous system development; positive regulation of skeletal muscle acetylcholine-gated channel clustering; rod bipolar cell differentiation; heart development; transmembrane receptor protein tyrosine phosphatase signaling pathway; brain development; negative regulation of cell migration; retina development in camera-type eye; negative regulation of neuromuscular junction development; spinal cord development; regulation of cell shape; positive regulation of neuron projection development; positive regulation of apoptotic process; negative regulation of epithelial cell proliferation; negative regulation of angiogenesis; retinal rod cell differentiation; endothelial cell differentiation; liver development; negative regulation of mesenchymal cell proliferation; cellular response to hypoxia; positive regulation of cell division; long-term potentiation; positive regulation of cell-substrate adhesion; positive regulation of cell population proliferation; regulation of signaling receptor activity; negative regulation of phosphoprotein phosphatase activity
Sources:Amigo / QuickGO
Orthologs
Species	Human	Mouse
Entrez	5764	19242
Ensembl	ENSG00000105894	ENSMUSG00000029838
UniProt	P21246	P63089
RefSeq (mRNA)	NM_002825; NM_001321386; NM_001321387	NM_008973
RefSeq (protein)	NP_001308315; NP_001308316; NP_002816	NP_032999
Location (UCSC)	Chr 7: 137.23 – 137.34 Mb	Chr 6: 36.69 – 36.79 Mb
PubMed search
- Wikidata
View/Edit Human	View/Edit Mouse

Pleiotrophin (PTN) also known as heparin-binding brain mitogen (HBBM) or heparin-binding growth factor 8 (HBGF-8) or neurite growth-promoting factor 1 (NEGF1) or heparin affinity regulatory peptide (HARP) or heparin binding growth associated molecule (HB-GAM) is a protein that in humans is encoded by the PTN gene. Pleiotrophin is an 18-kDa growth factor that has a high affinity for heparin. It is structurally related to midkine and retinoic acid induced heparin-binding protein.

== Function ==
Pleiotrophin was initially recognized as a neurite outgrowth-promoting factor present in rat brain around birth and as a mitogen toward fibroblasts isolated from bovine uterus tissue. Together with midkine these growth-factors constitute a family of (developmentally regulated) secreted heparin-binding proteins now known as the neurite growth-promoting factor (NEGF) family. During embryonic and early postnatal development, pleiotrophin is expressed in the central and peripheral nervous system and also in several non-neural tissues, notably lung, kidney, gut and bone. Pleiotrophin is also expressed by several tumor cells and is thought to be involved in tumor angiogenesis. In the adult central nervous system, pleiotrophin is expressed in an activity-dependent manner in the hippocampus where it can suppress long term potentiation induction. Pleiotrophin expression is low in other areas of the adult brain, but it can be induced by ischemic insults. or targeted neuronal damaged in the entorhinal cortex or in the substantia nigra pars compacta.

== Clinical significance ==
Pleiotrophin binds to cell-surface nucleolin as a low affinity receptor. This binding can inhibit HIV infection.
