= SUGT1 =

Human protein and coding gene

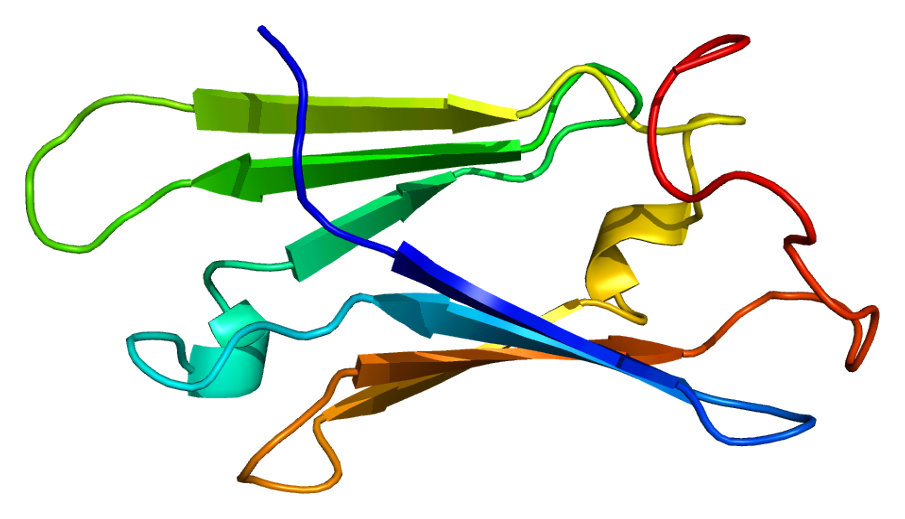
Available structures
| PDB | Ortholog search: PDBe RCSB |
| PDB | List of PDB id codes 1RL1 |

Identifiers
- Aliases: SUGT1, SGT1, SGT1 homolog, MIS12 kinetochore complex assembly cochaperone
- External IDs: OMIM: 604098; MGI: 1915205; HomoloGene: 4877; GeneCards: SUGT1; OMA:SUGT1 - orthologs

Gene location (Human)
| Chr. | Chromosome 13 (human) |
| Band | 13q14.3 | Start | 52,652,709 bp |
| Band | 13q14.3 | End | 52,700,909 bp |

Gene location (Mouse)
| Chr. | Chromosome 14 (mouse) |
| Band | 14|14 D3 | Start | 79,825,131 bp |
| Band | 14|14 D3 | End | 79,872,636 bp |
RNA expression pattern
| Bgee | Human / Mouse (ortholog); Top expressed in: cardiac muscle tissue of right atrium; pancreatic epithelial cell; myocardium of left ventricle; oocyte; cartilage tissue; parietal pleura; tibia; pancreatic ductal cell; gingival epithelium; tendon of biceps brachii / Top expressed in: morula; morula; blastocyst; otic vesicle; medial ganglionic eminence; abdominal wall; epiblast; superior surface of tongue; otic placode; spermatid; More reference expression data |
| BioGPS | n/a |
Gene ontology
| Molecular function | protein binding |
| Cellular component | cytoplasm; cytosol; nucleus; kinetochore; ubiquitin ligase complex; protein-containing complex |
| Biological process | regulation of protein stability; mitotic cell cycle; protein stabilization |
Sources:Amigo / QuickGO
Orthologs
| Species | Human | Mouse |
| Entrez | 10910 | 67955 |
| Ensembl | ENSG00000165416 | ENSMUSG00000022024 |
| UniProt | Q9Y2Z0 | Q9CX34 |
| RefSeq (mRNA) | NM_001130912; NM_006704; NM_001320831 | NM_026474 |
| RefSeq (protein) | NP_001124384; NP_001307760; NP_006695 | NP_080750 |
| Location (UCSC) | Chr 13: 52.65 – 52.7 Mb | Chr 14: 79.83 – 79.87 Mb |
| PubMed search |
- Wikidata
| View/Edit Human | View/Edit Mouse |

Suppressor of G2 allele of SKP1 homolog is a protein that in humans is encoded by the SUGT1 gene.

== Function ==
This gene is homologous to the yeast gene SGT1, which encodes a protein involved in kinetochore function and required for the G1/S and G2/M transitions. Complementation studies suggest that the human protein has similar functions.

== Interactions ==
SUGT1 has been shown to interact with S100A6.
