= S100A5 =

Protein found in humans

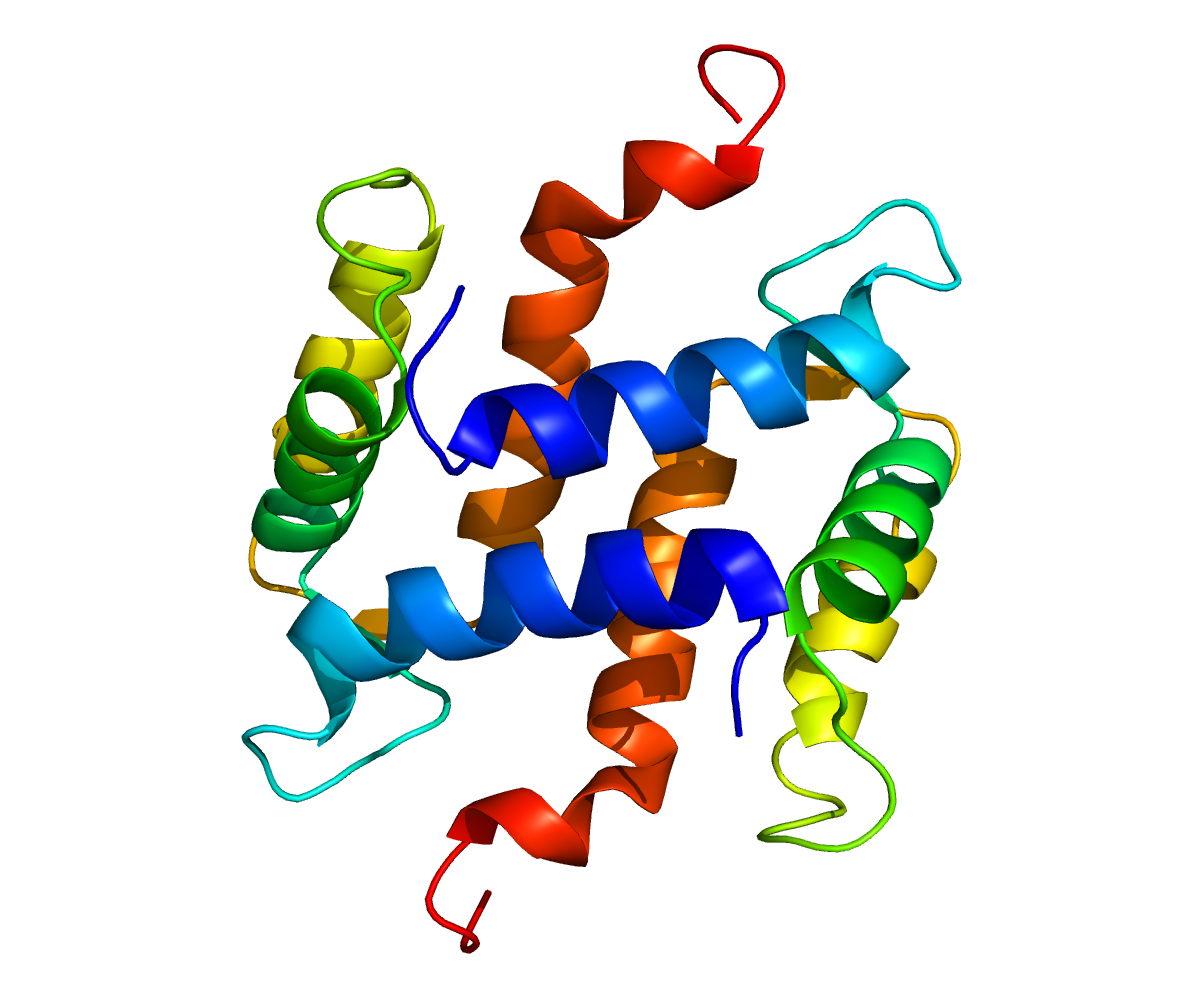

Identifiers
- Aliases: S100A5, S100D, S100 calcium binding protein A5
- External IDs: OMIM: 176991; MGI: 1338915; GeneCards: S100A5
Available structures
PDB	Ortholog search: PDBe RCSB
PDB	List of PDB id codes 2KAX, 2KAY, 4DIR

Gene location (Human)
Chr.	Chromosome 1 (human)
Band	1q21.3	Start	153,537,147 bp
Band	1q21.3	End	153,541,765 bp

Gene location (Mouse)
Chr.	Chromosome 3 (mouse)
Band	3 F1|3 39.27 cM	Start	90,515,830 bp
Band	3 F1|3 39.27 cM	End	90,519,087 bp
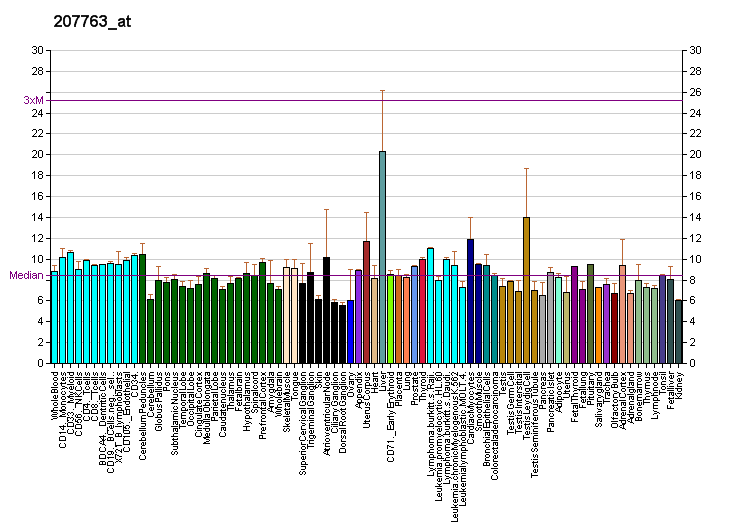

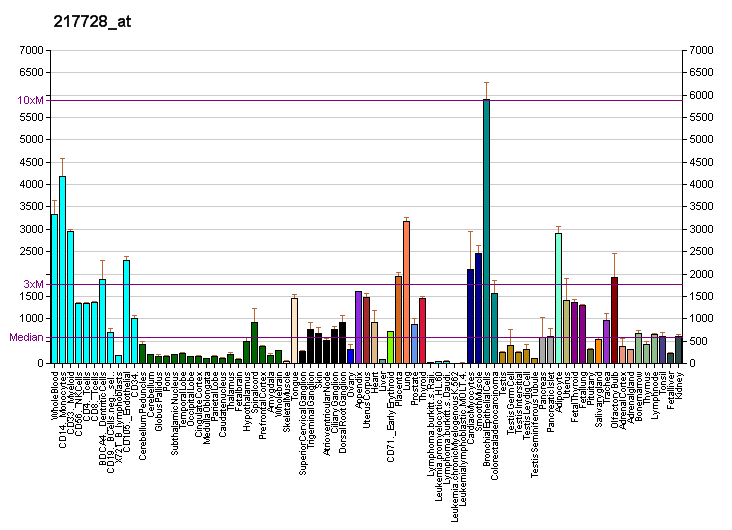
RNA expression pattern
Bgee	Human / Mouse (ortholog); Top expressed in: granulocyte; left lobe of thyroid gland; right lobe of thyroid gland; monocyte; olfactory zone of nasal mucosa; gastric mucosa; blood; Descending thoracic aorta; left uterine tube; skin of leg / Top expressed in: olfactory epithelium; right ventricle; olfactory bulb; extraocular muscle; transitional epithelium of urinary bladder; lumbar subsegment of spinal cord; gastrula; temporal muscle; migratory enteric neural crest cell; submandibular gland; More reference expression data
BioGPS	More reference expression data
Orthologs
Databases	NCBI: entry; OMA: entry
Species	Human	Mouse
Entrez	6276	20199
Ensembl	ENSG00000196420	ENSMUSG00000001023
UniProt	P33763	P63084
RefSeq (mRNA)	NM_002962; NM_001394232; NM_001394233; NM_001394234	NM_011312
RefSeq (protein)	NP_002953	NP_035442
Location (UCSC)	Chr 1: 153.54 – 153.54 Mb	Chr 3: 90.52 – 90.52 Mb
PubMed search
- Wikidata
View/Edit Human	View/Edit Mouse

S100 calcium-binding protein A5 (S100A5) is a protein that is encoded by the S100A5 gene in humans.

The protein encoded by this gene is a member of the S100 family of proteins containing 2 EF-hand calcium-binding motifs. S100 proteins are localized in the cytoplasm and/or nucleus of a wide range of cells and are involved in the regulation of a number of cellular processes, such as cell cycle progression and differentiation. S100 genes include at least 13 members which are located as a cluster on chromosome 1q21. This protein has a Ca^{2+} affinity 20- to 100-fold higher than the other S100 proteins studied under identical conditions. This protein also binds Zn^{2+} and Cu^{2+}, and Cu^{2+} strongly which impairs the binding of Ca^{2+}. This protein is expressed in very restricted regions of the adult brain.
