= PGM1 =

Protein-coding gene in humans

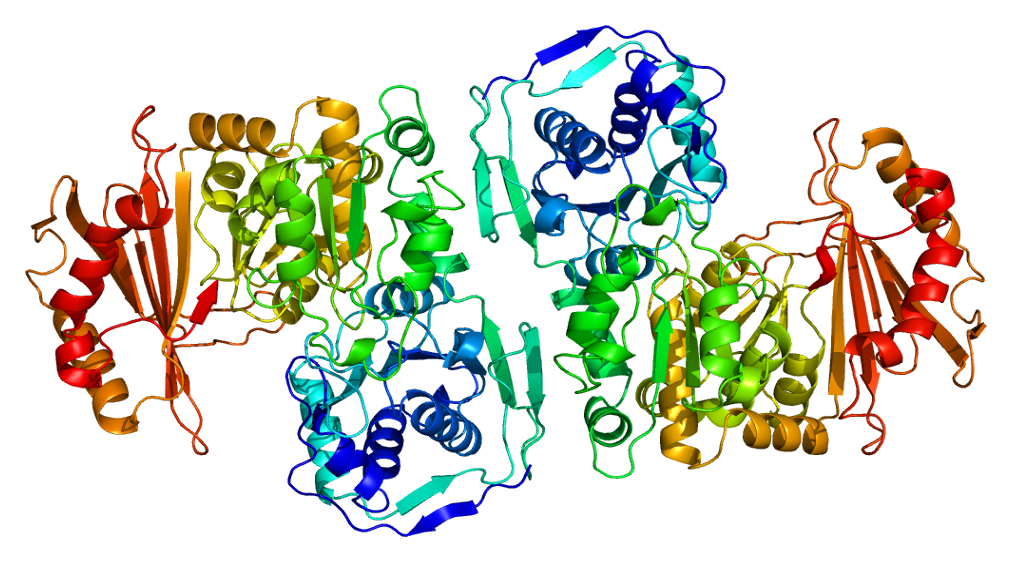

Identifiers
- Aliases: PGM1, CDG1T, GSD14, phosphoglucomutase 1
- External IDs: OMIM: 171900; MGI: 97565; GeneCards: PGM1
Available structures
PDB	Ortholog search: PDBe RCSB
PDB	List of PDB id codes 5F9C, 5HSH, 5EPC
Enzyme activity
EC #	BRENDA	ExPASy	KEGG	MetaCyc
5.4.2.2	↗	↗	↗	↗

Gene location (Human)
Chr.	Chromosome 1 (human)
Band	1p31.3	Start	63,593,411 bp
Band	1p31.3	End	63,660,245 bp

Gene location (Mouse)
Chr.	Chromosome 4 (mouse)
Band	4 C6|4 45.71 cM	Start	99,929,414 bp
Band	4 C6|4 45.71 cM	End	99,987,294 bp
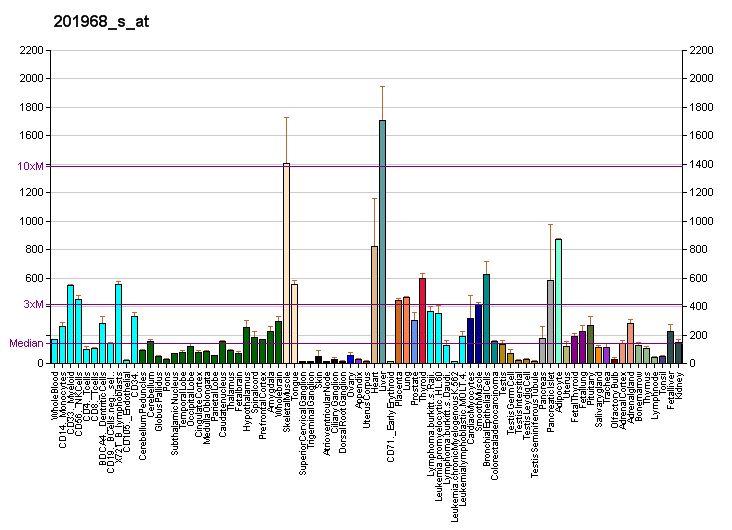
RNA expression pattern
Bgee	Human / Mouse (ortholog); Top expressed in: Skeletal muscle tissue of rectus abdominis; biceps brachii; vastus lateralis muscle; Skeletal muscle tissue of biceps brachii; glutes; gastrocnemius muscle; triceps brachii muscle; deltoid muscle; muscle of thigh; thoracic diaphragm / Top expressed in: skeletal muscle tissue; quadriceps femoris muscle; muscle of thigh; heart; proximal tubule; white adipose tissue; zone of skin; esophagus; right kidney; hepatobiliary system; More reference expression data
BioGPS	More reference expression data
Gene ontology
Molecular function	intramolecular transferase activity, phosphotransferases; protein binding; isomerase activity; metal ion binding; magnesium ion binding; phosphoglucomutase activity
Cellular component	cytoplasm; cytosol; extracellular exosome; actin cytoskeleton; extracellular region; tertiary granule lumen; ficolin-1-rich granule lumen
Biological process	gluconeogenesis; glycogen biosynthetic process; glycogen catabolic process; glycolytic process; organic substance metabolic process; galactose catabolic process; glucose metabolic process; neutrophil degranulation; carbohydrate metabolic process
Sources:Amigo / QuickGO
Orthologs
Databases	NCBI: entry; OMA: entry
Species	Human	Mouse
Entrez	5236	72157
Ensembl	ENSG00000079739	ENSMUSG00000025791
UniProt	P36871	Q9D0F9
RefSeq (mRNA)	NM_002633; NM_001172818; NM_001172819	NM_028132
RefSeq (protein)	NP_001166289; NP_001166290; NP_002624	NP_082408
Location (UCSC)	Chr 1: 63.59 – 63.66 Mb	Chr 4: 99.93 – 99.99 Mb
PubMed search
- Wikidata
View/Edit Human	View/Edit Mouse

Phosphoglucomutase-1 is an enzyme that in humans is encoded by the PGM1 gene. The protein encoded by this gene is an isozyme of phosphoglucomutase (PGM) and belongs to the phosphohexose mutase family. There are several PGM isozymes, which are encoded by different genes and catalyze the transfer of phosphate between the 1 and 6 positions of glucose. In most cell types, this PGM isozyme is predominant, representing about 90% of total PGM activity. In red blood cells, PGM2 is a major isozyme. This gene is highly polymorphic. Mutations in this gene cause CDG syndrome type 1t (CDG1T, formerly known as glycogen storage disease type XIV). Alternatively spliced transcript variants encoding different isoforms have been identified in this gene.[provided by RefSeq, Mar 2010]

== Structure ==
The PGM1 gene is localized to the first chromosome, with its specific region being 1p31. The complete PGM1 gene spans over 65 kb and contains 11 exons, and the sites of the two mutations which form the molecular basis for the common PGM1 protein polymorphism lie in exons 4 and 8 and are 18 kb apart. Within this region there is a site of intragenic recombination. There are two alternatively spliced first exons, one of which, exon 1A, is transcribed in a wide variety of cell types; the other, exon 1B, is transcribed in fast muscle tissue. Exon 1A is transcribed from a promoter that has the structural hallmarks of a housekeeping promoter but lies more than 35 kb upstream of exon 2. Exon 1B lies 6 kb upstream of exon 2 within the large first intron of the ubiquitously expressed PGM1 transcript. The fast-muscle form of PGM1 is characterized by 18 extra amino acid residues at its N-terminal end. Sequence comparisons show that exons 1A and 1B are structurally related and have arisen by duplication.

PGM1 is a monomeric protein with 562 amino acids and four structural domains arranged in an overall heart shape. The active site is located in the large, centrally located cleft, formed by more than 80 residues. The active site can be segregated into four highly conserved regions that contribute to catalysis and substrate binding. These regions are: the phosphoserine residue that participates in phosphoryl transfer; the metal- binding loop; a sugar-binding loop; and the phosphate-binding site that interacts with the phosphate group of the substrate. The active site cleft of PGM1 relies on all four structural domains of the enzyme for its structural integrity.

== Function ==
The biochemical pathways required to utilize glucose as a carbon and energy source are highly conserved from bacteria to humans. PGM1 is an evolutionarily conserved enzyme that regulates one of the most important metabolic carbohydrate trafficking points in prokaryotic and eukaryotic organisms, catalyzing the bi-directional interconversion of glucose 1-phosphate (G-1-P) and glucose 6-phosphate (G-6-P). In one direction, G-1-P produced from sucrose catabolism is converted to G-6-P, the first intermediate in glycolysis. In the other direction, conversion of G-6-P to G-1-P generates a substrate for synthesis of UDP-glucose, which is required for synthesis of a variety of cellular constituents, including cell wall polymers and glycoproteins. PGM1 has been used extensively as a genetic marker for isozyme polymorphism among humans. PGM is known to be post-translationally modified by cytoplasmic glycosylation that does not seem to regulate its enzymatic activity but rather is implicated in the localization of the protein. Glucose 1,6 bisphosphate (Glc-1, 6-P2), a powerful regulator of carbohydrate metabolism, has been demonstrated to be a potent activator of PGM. PGM1 is also modified by phosphorylation on Ser108 as part of its catalytic mechanism. This is shown to be performed by Pak1, a previously identified signaling kinase.

== Clinical significance ==
Phosphoglucomutase 1 (PGM1) deficiency is an inherited metabolic disorder in humans (CDG syndrome type 1t, CDG1T). Affected patients show multiple disease phenotypes, including dilated cardiomyopathy, exercise intolerance, and hepatopathy, reflecting the central role of the enzyme in glucose/glycogen metabolism. The biochemical phenotypes of the PGM1 mutants cluster into two groups: those with compromised catalysis and those with possible folding defects. Relative to the recombinant wild-type enzyme, certain missense mutants show greatly decreased expression of soluble protein and/or increased aggregation. In contrast, other missense variants are well behaved in solution, but show dramatic reductions in enzyme activity, with K_{cat}/K_{m} often <1.5% of wild-type. Modest changes in protein conformation and flexibility are also apparent in some of the catalytically impaired variants. In the case of the G291R mutant, severely compromised activity is linked to the inability of a key active site serine to be phosphorylated, a prerequisite for catalysis. Our results complement previous in vivo studies, which suggest that both protein misfolding and catalytic impairment may play a role in PGM1 deficiency.

== Interactions ==
PGM1 has been shown to interact with S100 calcium binding protein A1 and S100B.
