= S100A7A =

Protein found in humans

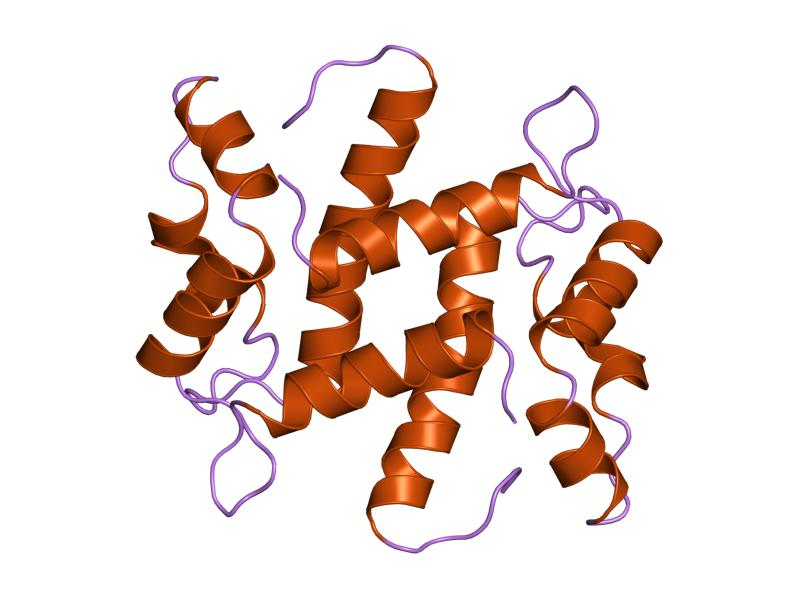

Identifiers
- Aliases: S100A7A, NICE-2, S100A15, S100A7L1, S100A7f, S100 calcium binding protein A7A, NICE2
- External IDs: OMIM: 617427; GeneCards: S100A7A
Available structures
PDB	Human UniProt search: PDBe RCSB
PDB	List of PDB id codes 4AQI

Gene location (Human)
Chr.	Chromosome 1 (human)
Band	1q21.3	Start	153,416,520 bp
Band	1q21.3	End	153,423,222 bp
RNA expression pattern
Bgee	Human / Mouse (ortholog); Top expressed in: testicle; human penis; sperm; gingival epithelium; buccal mucosa cell; vulva; body of tongue; superior surface of tongue; tail of epididymis; tonsil / n/a; More reference expression data
BioGPS	n/a
Orthologs
Databases	NCBI: entry; OMA: entry
Species	Human	Mouse
Entrez	338324	n/a
Ensembl	ENSG00000184330	n/a
UniProt	Q86SG5	n/a
RefSeq (mRNA)	NM_176823	n/a
RefSeq (protein)	NP_789793	n/a
Location (UCSC)	Chr 1: 153.42 – 153.42 Mb	n/a
PubMed search		n/a
- Wikidata
View/Edit Human

Protein S100-A7A (S100A7A), also known as koebnerisin, is a protein that in humans is encoded by the S100A7A (alias: S100A15) gene.

S100 proteins are a diverse calcium-binding family that regulate fundamental cellular and extracellular processes including cell proliferation and differentiation, cell migration, and the antimicrobial host defense as antimicrobial peptides.

Koebnerisin (S100A7A) was first identified upregulated in inflammation-prone psoriatic skin, suggesting involvement in the lesional phenotype of the disease, Koebner phenomenon. Today, the protein is of further interest because of its role in antimicrobial defence, innate immunity, epidermal cell maturation and epithelial tumorigenesis.

== Function ==
=== Epithelial homeostasis and antimicrobial host defense ===
Skin: In normal epidermis, koebnerisin (S100A7A) is expressed by epidermal basal and differentiated keratinocytes, melanocytes, and Langerhans cells. Within the pilosebaceous unit, S100A7A is found in the inner and external root sheath and the basal layer of the sebaceous gland. In the dermis, koebnerisin (S100A7A) is produced by dendritic cells, smooth muscle cells, endothelial cells, as well as fibroblasts to control tissue regeneration.

Breast: Koebnerisin (S100A7A) is expressed by alveolar and small duct luminal cells and by epithelial-derived myoepithelial cells around acini and by surrounding blood vessels.

Koebnerisin (S100A7A) functions as an antimicrobial peptide (AMP) reducing survival of E. coli and was strongly regulated by several bacterial components, such as Pseudomonas aeruginosa and Staphylococcus aureus. Thus, koebnerisin participates in the antimicrobial host defence of the skin and in the digestive tract of breast-feeding newborns.

=== Epithelial carcinogenesis ===
Breast cancer: Koebnerisin (S100A7A) is overexpressed in ER/PR negative tumors suggesting a regulation with tumor progression. The secreted koebnerisin (S100A7A) acts as a chemoattractant, enhances inflammation and thus could drive breast carcinogenesis.

=== Inflammation ===
Koebnerisin (S100A7A) is overexpressed in inflammatory skin diseases, such as psoriasis and eczema. It is regulated through Th1 and Th17 but not Th2 proinflammatory cytokines. When released into the extracellar space, koebnerisin (S100A7A) induces inflammation. It acts as a chemoattractant for myeloid leukocytes through a pertussis toxin sensitive Gi protein coupled receptor. Koebnerisin (S100A7A) amplifies inflammation with related psoriasin (S100A7) that is co-regulated and proinflammatory through RAGE.

== Genomic organization and mRNA splice variants ==
Koebnerisin (S100A7A) maps to the S100 gene cluster within the epidermal differentiation complex (EDC, chromosome 1q21) and reveals an unusual genomic organization compared to other S100 members. The two alternative mRNA-isoforms of koebnerisin share the same coding region, but show differences in composition and length of adjacent untranslated regions (S100A7A-short (S): 0.5 kb vs. hS100A7A-long (L): 4.4 kb). Both splice variants are differently regulated in inflammatory skin diseases suggesting usage of alternate promoters.

== Protein ==
The amino acid sequence reveals a conserved C-terminal and a variant N-terminal EF-hand typical for S100 proteins (101 amino acids, 11.305 Da, calculated pI of 7.57 kDa). Compared to most S100 proteins, koebnerisin (S100A7A) is basic.

== Evolution ==
=== Primate ===
Koebnerisin (S100A7A) has lately evolved by gene duplications within the Epidermal Differentiation Complex (EDC, chromosome 1q21) during primate evolution forming a novel S100 subfamily together with Psoriasin (S100A7). Therefore, koebnerisin is almost identical to psoriasin in sequence (>90%). Despite their high homology, koebnerisin (S100A7A) and psoriasin (S100A7) are distinct in tissue distribution, regulation, structure and function and, thus exemplary for the diversity within the S100 family. Their different properties are compelling reasons to discriminate S100A7A (koebnerisin) and S100A7 (psoriasin) in epithelial homeostasis, inflammation and cancer.

=== Rodent ===
Koebnerisin (S100A7A) and psoriasin (S100A7) share a common protein in mice encoded by the S100a7a15 (alias: mS100A7, mS100A15, mS100a7a) gene. It can be used to study the significance of the corresponding human proteins for epidermal maturation, inflammation and epithelial carcinogenesis.
