= S100A14 =

Protein found in humans

Identifiers
- Aliases: S100A14, BCMP84, S100A15, S100 calcium binding protein A14
- External IDs: OMIM: 607986; MGI: 1913416; GeneCards: S100A14
Available structures
PDB	Ortholog search: PDBe RCSB
PDB	List of PDB id codes 2M0R

Gene location (Human)
Chr.	Chromosome 1 (human)
Band	1q21.3	Start	153,614,255 bp
Band	1q21.3	End	153,616,986 bp

Gene location (Mouse)
Chr.	Chromosome 3 (mouse)
Band	3|3 F1	Start	90,434,163 bp
Band	3|3 F1	End	90,436,144 bp
RNA expression pattern
Bgee	Human / Mouse (ortholog); Top expressed in: mucosa of pharynx; mucosa of transverse colon; skin of abdomen; oral cavity; body of tongue; skin of leg; gums; rectum; gingival epithelium; vulva / Top expressed in: esophagus; lip; skin of abdomen; skin of external ear; epidermis; hair follicle; skin of back; pyloric antrum; mucous cell of stomach; left colon; More reference expression data
BioGPS	n/a
Gene ontology
Molecular function	protein binding; chemokine receptor binding; calcium ion binding
Cellular component	cell junction; perinuclear region of cytoplasm; extracellular exosome; cytoplasm; cytosol; nuclear body; plasma membrane
Biological process	positive regulation of monocyte chemotaxis; response to lipopolysaccharide; calcium ion homeostasis; apoptotic process; toll-like receptor 4 signaling pathway; defense response to bacterium; positive regulation of granulocyte chemotaxis
Sources:Amigo / QuickGO
Orthologs
Databases	NCBI: entry; OMA: entry
Species	Human	Mouse
Entrez	57402	66166
Ensembl	ENSG00000189334	ENSMUSG00000042306
UniProt	Q9HCY8	Q9D2Q8
RefSeq (mRNA)	NM_020672	NM_001163525; NM_001163526; NM_025393
RefSeq (protein)	NP_065723	NP_001156997; NP_001156998; NP_079669
Location (UCSC)	Chr 1: 153.61 – 153.62 Mb	Chr 3: 90.43 – 90.44 Mb
PubMed search
- Wikidata
View/Edit Human	View/Edit Mouse

S100 calcium binding protein A14 (S100A14) is a protein that in humans is encoded by the S100A14 gene.

== Function ==
This gene encodes a member of the S100 protein family which contains an EF-hand motif and binds calcium. The gene is located in a cluster of S100 genes on chromosome 1. Levels of the encoded protein have been found to be lower in cancerous tissue and associated with metastasis suggesting a tumor suppressor function.
