= S100B =

Human protein and coding gene

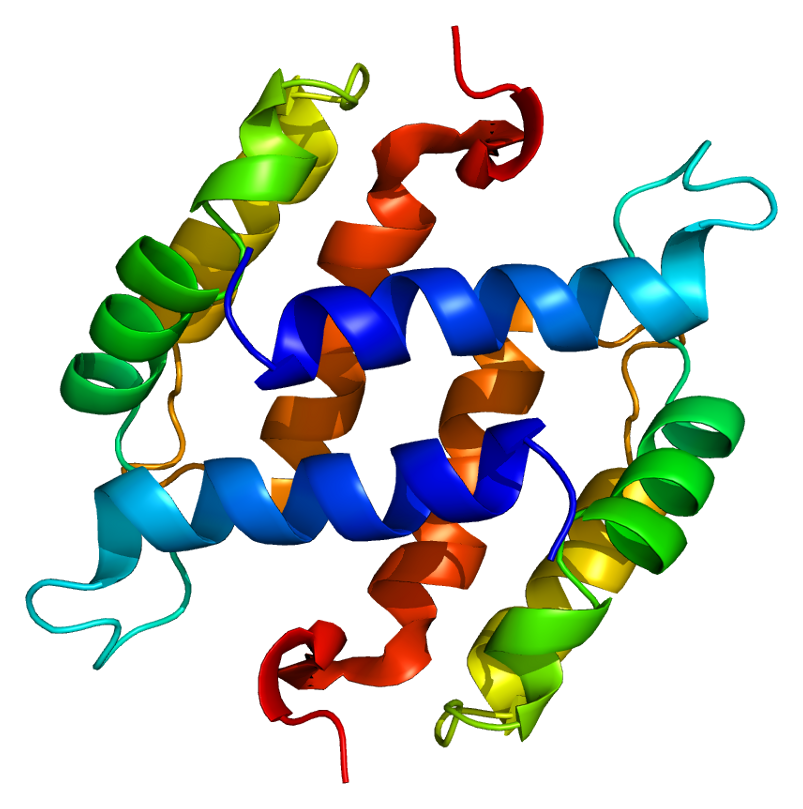

Identifiers
- Aliases: S100B, NEF, S100, S100-B, S100beta, S100 calcium binding protein B
- External IDs: OMIM: 176990; MGI: 98217; GeneCards: S100B
Available structures
PDB	Ortholog search: PDBe RCSB
PDB	List of PDB id codes 1MQ1, 1UWO, 2H61, 2M49, 2PRU, 3CZT, 3D0Y, 3D10, 3HCM, 4XYN, 5CSJ, 5CSF, 5CSN, 5CSI

Gene location (Human)
Chr.	Chromosome 21 (human)
Band	21q22.3	Start	46,598,604 bp
Band	21q22.3	End	46,605,208 bp

Gene location (Mouse)
Chr.	Chromosome 10 (mouse)
Band	10 C1|10 38.76 cM	Start	76,089,687 bp
Band	10 C1|10 38.76 cM	End	76,096,993 bp
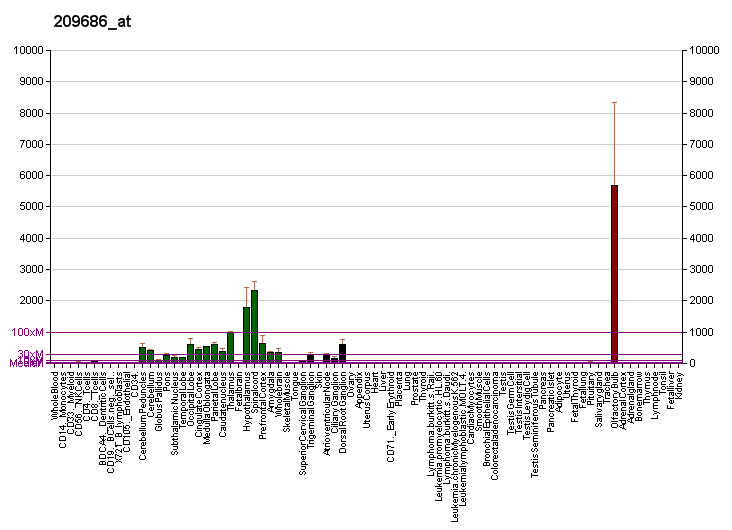
RNA expression pattern
Bgee	Human / Mouse (ortholog); Top expressed in: C1 segment; inferior ganglion of vagus nerve; olfactory bulb; subthalamic nucleus; trigeminal ganglion; internal globus pallidus; medulla oblongata; superior vestibular nucleus; substantia nigra; pars reticulata / Top expressed in: vestibular membrane of cochlear duct; lobe of cerebellum; anterior horn of spinal cord; cerebellar vermis; deep cerebellar nuclei; stria vascularis; pontine nuclei; facial motor nucleus; optic nerve; utricle; More reference expression data
BioGPS	More reference expression data
Gene ontology
Molecular function	calcium ion binding; S100 protein binding; protein homodimerization activity; zinc ion binding; metal ion binding; calcium-dependent protein binding; protein binding; identical protein binding; tau protein binding; signaling receptor binding; RAGE receptor binding
Cellular component	cytoplasm; ruffle; extracellular region; soma; perinuclear region of cytoplasm; nucleus; extracellular space
Biological process	axonogenesis; response to glucocorticoid; memory; negative regulation of skeletal muscle cell differentiation; central nervous system development; astrocyte differentiation; positive regulation of synaptic transmission; positive regulation of cell population proliferation; regulation of cell shape; positive regulation of apoptotic process; learning or memory; positive regulation of I-kappaB kinase/NF-kappaB signaling; regulation of neuronal synaptic plasticity; response to methylmercury; cell population proliferation; innate immune response; cellular response to hypoxia; long-term potentiation; positive regulation of myelination
Sources:Amigo / QuickGO
Orthologs
Databases	NCBI: entry; OMA: entry
Species	Human	Mouse
Entrez	6285	20203
Ensembl	ENSG00000160307	ENSMUSG00000033208
UniProt	P04271	P50114
RefSeq (mRNA)	NM_006272	NM_009115
RefSeq (protein)	NP_006263	NP_033141
Location (UCSC)	Chr 21: 46.6 – 46.61 Mb	Chr 10: 76.09 – 76.1 Mb
PubMed search
- Wikidata
View/Edit Human	View/Edit Mouse

S100 calcium-binding protein B (S100B) is a protein of the S100 protein family.

S100 proteins are localized in the cytoplasm and nucleus of a wide range of cells, and involved in the regulation of a number of cellular processes such as cell cycle progression and differentiation. S100 genes include at least 13 members which are located as a cluster on chromosome 1q21; however, this gene is located at 21q22.3.

== Function ==
S100B is glial-specific and is expressed primarily by astrocytes, but not all astrocytes express S100B. It has been shown that S100B is only expressed by a subtype of mature astrocytes that ensheath blood vessels and by NG2-expressing cells.

This protein may function in neurite extension, proliferation of melanoma cells, stimulation of Ca^{2+} fluxes, inhibition of PKC-mediated phosphorylation, astrocytosis and axonal proliferation, and inhibition of microtubule assembly. In the developing CNS it acts as a neurotrophic factor and neuronal survival protein. In the adult organism it is usually elevated due to nervous system damage, which makes it a potential clinical marker.

== Clinical significance ==
Chromosomal rearrangements and altered expression of this gene have been implicated in several neurological, neoplastic, and other types of diseases, including Alzheimer's disease, Down syndrome, epilepsy, amyotrophic lateral sclerosis, schwannoma, melanoma, and type I diabetes mellitus.

It has been suggested that the regulation of S100B by melittin has potential for the treatment of epilepsy.

== Diagnostic use ==
S100B is secreted by astrocytes or can spill from injured cells and enter the extracellular space or bloodstream. Serum levels of S100B increase in patients during the acute phase of brain damage. Over the last decade, S100B has emerged as a candidate peripheral biomarker of blood–brain barrier (BBB) permeability and CNS injury. Elevated S100B levels accurately reflect the presence of neuropathological conditions including traumatic head injury or neurodegenerative diseases. Normal S100B levels reliably exclude major CNS pathology. Its potential clinical use in the therapeutic decision making process is substantiated by a vast body of literature validating variations in serum 100B levels with standard modalities for prognosticating the extent of CNS damage: alterations in neuroimaging, cerebrospinal pressure, and other brain molecular markers (neuron specific enolase and glial fibrillary acidic protein). However, more importantly, S100B levels have been reported to rise prior to any detectable changes in intracerebral pressure, neuroimaging, and neurological examination findings. Thus, the major advantage of using S100B is that elevations in serum or CSF levels provide a sensitive measure for determining CNS injury at the molecular level before gross changes develop, enabling timely delivery of crucial medical intervention before irreversible damage occurs. S100B serum levels are elevated before seizures suggesting that BBB leakage may be an early event in seizure development. An extremely important application of serum S100B testing is in the selection of patients with minor head injury who do not need further neuroradiological evaluation, as studies comparing CT scans and S100B levels have demonstrated S100B values below 0.12 ng/mL are associated with low risk of obvious neuroradiological changes (such as intracranial hemorrhage or brain swelling) or significant clinical sequelae. The excellent negative predictive value of S100B in several neurological conditions is due to the fact that serum S100B levels reflect blood–brain barrier permeability changes even in absence of neuronal injury. In addition, S100B, which is also present in human melanocytes, is a reliable marker for melanoma malignancy both in bioptic tissue and in serum.

== Interactions ==
S100B has been shown to interact with:

- AHNAK,
- IMPA1,
- IQGAP1,
- MAPT, and
- P53,
- PGM1,
- S100A1,
- S100A6,
- S100A11,
- VAV1.
