= S100A1 =

Protein-coding gene in humans

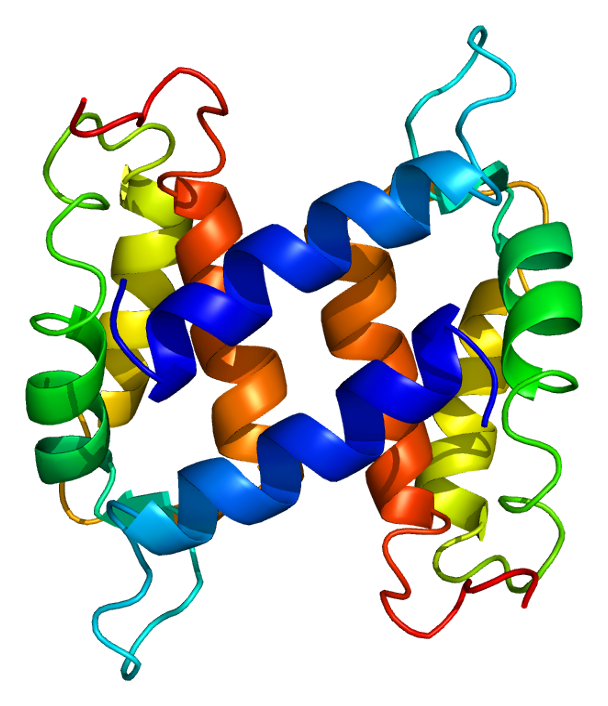

Identifiers
- Aliases: S100A1, S100, S100-alpha, S100A, S100 calcium-binding protein A1, S100 calcium binding protein A1
- External IDs: OMIM: 176940; MGI: 1338917; GeneCards: S100A1
Available structures
PDB	Ortholog search: PDBe RCSB
PDB	List of PDB id codes 2L0P, 2LHL, 2LLS, 2LLT, 2LLU, 2LP2, 2LP3, 2LUX, 2M3W

Gene location (Human)
Chr.	Chromosome 1 (human)
Band	1q21.3	Start	153,627,926 bp
Band	1q21.3	End	153,632,039 bp

Gene location (Mouse)
Chr.	Chromosome 3 (mouse)
Band	3 F1|3 39.24 cM	Start	90,418,341 bp
Band	3 F1|3 39.24 cM	End	90,421,699 bp
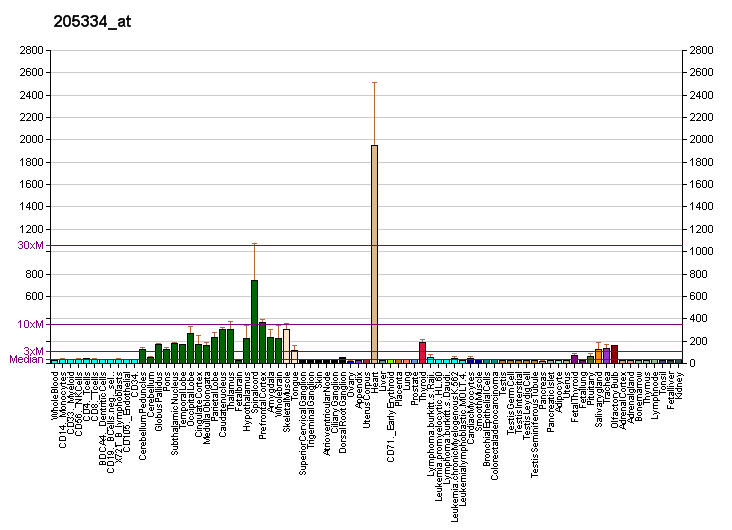
RNA expression pattern
Bgee	Human / Mouse (ortholog); Top expressed in: apex of heart; right auricle of heart; C1 segment; muscle of thigh; gastrocnemius muscle; left ventricle; myocardium of left ventricle; right frontal lobe; thoracic diaphragm; amygdala / Top expressed in: vestibular membrane of cochlear duct; transitional epithelium of urinary bladder; vestibular sensory epithelium; utricle; submandibular gland; interventricular septum; myocardium of ventricle; cardiac muscle tissue of left ventricle; right ventricle; right kidney; More reference expression data
BioGPS	More reference expression data
Gene ontology
Molecular function	calcium ion binding; S100 protein binding; protein homodimerization activity; ATPase binding; calcium-dependent protein binding; metal ion binding; protein binding; identical protein binding
Cellular component	cytoplasm; M band; I band; sarcoplasmic reticulum; Z discdkac; neuron projection; A band; nucleus; extracellular region; protein-containing complex
Biological process	intracellular signal transduction; regulation of heart contraction; substantia nigra development; positive regulation of voltage-gated calcium channel activity; negative regulation of transcription by RNA polymerase II; toll-like receptor signaling pathway; positive regulation of nitric-oxide synthase activity; positive regulation of sprouting angiogenesis
Sources:Amigo / QuickGO
Orthologs
Databases	NCBI: entry; OMA: entry
Species	Human	Mouse
Entrez	6271	20193
Ensembl	ENSG00000160678	ENSMUSG00000044080
UniProt	P23297	P56565
RefSeq (mRNA)	NM_006271	NM_011309
RefSeq (protein)	NP_006262	NP_035439
Location (UCSC)	Chr 1: 153.63 – 153.63 Mb	Chr 3: 90.42 – 90.42 Mb
PubMed search
- Wikidata
View/Edit Human	View/Edit Mouse

Protein S100-A1, also known as S100 calcium-binding protein A1, is a protein which in humans is encoded by the S100A1 gene. S100A1 is highly expressed in cardiac and skeletal muscle, and localizes to Z-discs and sarcoplasmic reticulum. S100A1 has shown promise as an effective candidate for gene therapy to treat post-myocardially infarcted cardiac tissue.

== Structure ==
S100A1 is a member of the S100 family of proteins expressed in cardiac muscle, skeletal muscle, and the brain, with the highest density at Z-lines and the sarcoplasmic reticulum. In its dimerized form, S100A1 contains four EF-hand calcium-binding motifs, and can exist as either a heterodimer or a homodimer. The homodimer is a high-affinity complex (nanomolar range or tighter) stabilized by hydrophobic packing within an X-type four-helix bundle formed by helices 1, 1′, 4, and 4′.

Protein nuclear magnetic resonance spectroscopy shows that each monomer is helical and contains two EF-hand loops: one in the N-terminus and a canonical EF-hand in the C-terminus. The C-terminal site has higher calcium affinity, with a dissociation constant of about 20 μM. The two EF-hands are positioned adjacent to each other in three-dimensional space and are linked by a short beta sheet (residues 27–29 and 68–70). Calcium binding triggers a conformational change in helix 3, which reorients from being nearly antiparallel to helix 4 to being roughly perpendicular. This mechanism is atypical among EF-hand proteins because the entering helix moves rather than the exiting one. The rearrangement exposes a large hydrophobic pocket between helices 3, 4, and the hinge region, which mediates most calcium-dependent target interactions.

These structural features are generally conserved across the S100 family, although helices 3, 4, and the hinge region are the most divergent areas. Sequence variation in these regions likely fine-tunes calcium-dependent target binding specificity. S-Nitrosylation of Cys85 further modifies the protein by reorganizing the C-terminal helix and the linker connecting the two EF-hands. The most accurate high-resolution solution structure of human apo-S100A1 (PDB accession code: 2L0P) was determined by NMR spectroscopy in 2011.

In addition to Ca^{2+}, S100A1 also binds Zn^{2+}. Mass spectrometry and isothermal titration calorimetry show up to four Zn^{2+} ions per monomer, with two high-affinity sites located within the EF-hands and two lower-affinity sites outside them. Zn^{2+} competes with Ca^{2+} at the EF-hands, producing mixed 2Ca^{2+}:S100A1:2Zn^{2+} species under saturating conditions. QM/MM modeling suggests that the N-terminal EF-hand favors Zn^{2+}, while the C-terminal site can accommodate both metals. Functionally, Ca^{2+} binding increases thermal stability, whereas excess Zn^{2+} destabilizes the protein and promotes aggregation. Despite this, S100A1 remains dimeric across all tested metal concentrations.

== Function ==
S100 proteins are localized in the cytoplasm and/or nucleus of many cell types, where they regulate processes such as cell cycle progression and differentiation. S100A1 may contribute to stimulation of Ca^{2+}-induced Ca^{2+} release, inhibition of microtubule assembly, and inhibition of protein kinase C-mediated phosphorylation.

During development, S100A1 is expressed in the primitive heart at embryonic day 8 at similar levels in both atria and ventricles. By embryonic day 17.5, expression becomes enriched in the ventricular myocardium and reduced in atrial tissue.

S100A1 is a regulator of myocardial contractility. Overexpression in rabbit or murine cardiomyocytes enhances contractile performance by increasing sarcoplasmic reticular Ca^{2+} transients and uptake, modifying myofibrillar Ca^{2+} sensitivity, enhancing SERCA2A activity, and promoting calcium-induced calcium release. S100A1 increases the gain of excitation-contraction coupling and decreases Ca^{2+} spark frequency in cardiomyocytes. It also enhances L-type calcium channel-mediated transsarcolemmal influx in a protein kinase A-dependent manner. S100A1 also interacts with the PEVK region of Titin in a Ca^{2+}-dependent manner, reducing passive force in vitro and suggesting a role in modulating Titin-based passive tension before systole. In mice lacking S100A1, cardiac reserve under β-adrenergic stimulation is reduced, with impaired contraction and relaxation rates and diminished Ca^{2+} sensitivity, although these animals do not develop cardiac hypertrophy or dilation with age.

== Clinical significance ==
=== Expression changes in disease ===
S100A1 expression is altered in several pathological contexts. In animal models, protein levels are increased in right ventricular cardiac hypertrophy associated with pulmonary hypertension, and in brain, skeletal muscle, and cardiac muscle in type I diabetes mellitus. At the transcriptional level, S100A1 helps regulate the genetic program underlying hypertrophy by inhibiting α_{1}-adrenergic induction of genes such as MYH7, ACTA1, and S100B.

=== Cardiac disease ===
In humans, reduced myocardial S100A1 expression has been linked to cardiomyopathies. Importantly, left ventricular assist device therapy does not restore myocardial S100A1 levels in patients with end-stage heart failure.

S100A1 regulates endothelial cell function, where its deficiency impairs post-ischemic angiogenesis. Downregulation has been observed in hypoxic tissue from patients with limb ischemia. In melanocytic cells, S100A1 expression may also be regulated by MITF.

=== Therapeutic potential ===
Therapeutic strategies have investigated S100A1 gene transfer. In a rat model of myocardial infarction, intracoronary adenoviral delivery of S100A1 restored Ca^{2+} handling, normalized intracellular sodium, reversed fetal gene expression, preserved contractility, reduced hypertrophy, and improved inotropic reserve. Similarly, transgenic overexpression of S100A1 in mice subjected to infarction preserved contractility, Ca^{2+} cycling, and β-adrenergic signaling, while preventing hypertrophy, apoptosis, and progression to heart failure, ultimately improving survival. Gene transfer to engineered heart tissue has also been shown to enhance contractile performance of tissue grafts, suggesting potential applications in regenerative therapy.

=== Biomarker potential ===
S100A1 has also been studied as a diagnostic and prognostic biomarker. Plasma levels rise early during acute myocardial ischemia, with a distinct timecourse compared to creatine kinase, CKMB, and troponin I. After ischemic injury, S100A1 is released from cardiomyocytes and can signal through Toll-like receptor 4 to modulate myocardial damage. Extracellular S100A1 also protects neonatal murine cardiomyocytes against apoptosis through ERK1/2-dependent pathways, suggesting that release from injured cells may function as an intrinsic survival mechanism. Elevated S100A1 has also been observed during cardiopulmonary bypass, both in infants with cyanotic heart disease undergoing uncontrolled hyperoxic reoxygenation and in adults undergoing cardiac surgery.

=== Drug interactions ===
Several drugs—including Pentamidine, Amlexanox, Olopatadine, Cromolyn, and Propranolol—bind to S100A1, though their affinities are generally in the mid-micromolar range.

== Research ==
S100A1 has emerged as a promising therapeutic target in heart failure research. Preclinical studies in large animal models and experiments on failing human cardiomyocytes have demonstrated that restoring S100A1 expression can reverse contractile dysfunction, normalize Ca^{2+} signalling, and improve overall myocardial performance. In a large-animal model of post-ischemic heart failure, cardiac-specific delivery of S100A1 via an AAV9 vector restored contractile reserve and prevented adverse remodeling. These findings highlight the translational potential of S100A1-based therapy.

S100A1 is a multifaceted therapeutic target that bridges basic cardiac physiology and clinical application. Collectively, these works propose that S100A1 modulates multiple aspects of cardiac physiology, including excitation–contraction coupling, β-adrenergic signaling, and mitochondrial energy metabolism.

Because of these pleiotropic effects, S100A1 gene therapy has been positioned as a potentially safer and more durable alternative to conventional heart failure drugs, which often target single signaling pathways. Preclinical data suggest that viral-mediated S100A1 delivery not only enhances contractility but also prevents maladaptive hypertrophy, apoptosis, and progression to heart failure. Current expert consensus places S100A1-based therapy "on the verge" of early clinical trials, with the potential to become part of a new generation of gene-based strategies for treating advanced heart failure.

== Interactions ==
S100 interacts with

- PGM1
- S100B
- S100A4
- TRPM3
- Titin
- RYR2
- SERCA2A
- PLB
- RYR1
