= S100A16 =

Protein found in humans

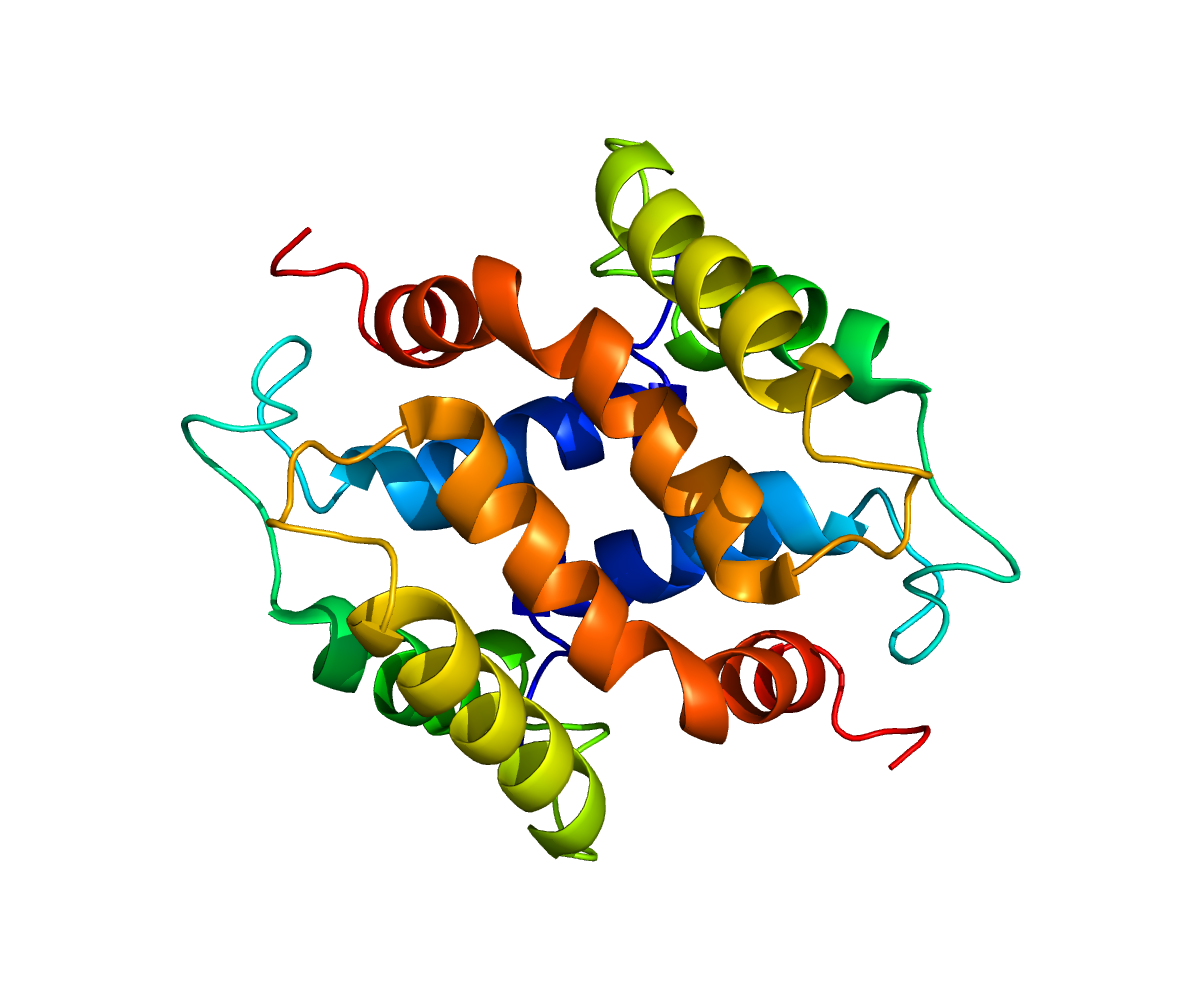

Identifiers
- Aliases: S100A16, DT1P1A7, S100F, AAG13, S100 calcium binding protein A16
- External IDs: OMIM: 617437; MGI: 1915110; GeneCards: S100A16
Available structures
PDB	Ortholog search: PDBe RCSB
PDB	List of PDB id codes 2L50, 2L51, 3NXA

Gene location (Human)
Chr.	Chromosome 1 (human)
Band	1q21.3	Start	153,606,886 bp
Band	1q21.3	End	153,613,145 bp

Gene location (Mouse)
Chr.	Chromosome 3 (mouse)
Band	3|3 F1	Start	90,537,254 bp
Band	3|3 F1	End	90,543,151 bp
RNA expression pattern
Bgee	Human / Mouse (ortholog); Top expressed in: mucosa of pharynx; mucosa of ileum; skin of arm; gingival epithelium; oral cavity; nasal epithelium; vulva; human penis; skin of abdomen; body of tongue / Top expressed in: esophagus; lip; optic nerve; skin of abdomen; hair follicle; conjunctival fornix; endothelial cell of lymphatic vessel; skin of external ear; left colon; transitional epithelium of urinary bladder; More reference expression data
BioGPS	n/a
Gene ontology
Molecular function	calcium ion binding; protein binding; protein homodimerization activity; metal ion binding; RNA binding
Cellular component	cytosol; plasma membrane; nucleolus; extracellular exosome; nucleus; cytoplasm; extracellular space
Biological process	response to calcium ion
Sources:Amigo / QuickGO
Orthologs
Databases	NCBI: entry; OMA: entry
Species	Human	Mouse
Entrez	140576	67860
Ensembl	ENSG00000188643	ENSMUSG00000074457
UniProt	Q96FQ6	Q9D708
RefSeq (mRNA)	NM_080388; NM_001317007; NM_001317008	NM_026416
RefSeq (protein)	NP_001303936; NP_001303937; NP_525127	NP_001343534; NP_001343535; NP_001343536; NP_001343537; NP_001343538 NP_001343539; NP_080692
Location (UCSC)	Chr 1: 153.61 – 153.61 Mb	Chr 3: 90.54 – 90.54 Mb
PubMed search
- Wikidata
View/Edit Human	View/Edit Mouse

S100 calcium-binding protein A16 (S100A16) is a protein that in humans is encoded by the S100A16 gene.
