= Nucleolin =

Protein

NCL
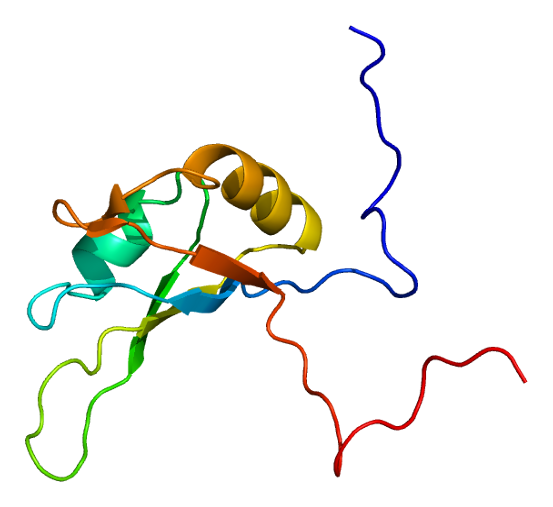

Identifiers
- Aliases: NCL, C23, nucleolin, Nsr1
- External IDs: OMIM: 164035; MGI: 97286; GeneCards: NCL
Available structures
PDB	Ortholog search: PDBe RCSB
PDB	List of PDB id codes 2FC8, 2FC9, 2KRR

Gene location (Human)
Chr.	Chromosome 2 (human)
Band	2q37.1	Start	231,453,531 bp
Band	2q37.1	End	231,483,641 bp

Gene location (Mouse)
Chr.	Chromosome 1 (mouse)
Band	1 C5|1 43.94 cM	Start	86,272,441 bp
Band	1 C5|1 43.94 cM	End	86,287,122 bp
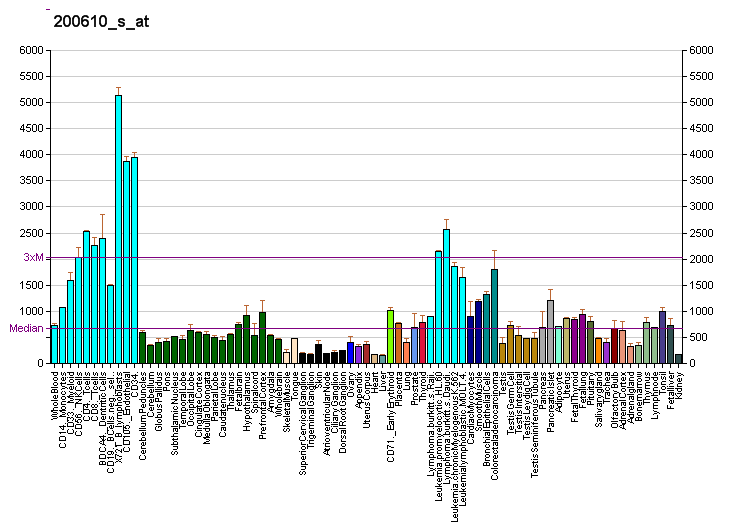
RNA expression pattern
Bgee	Human / Mouse (ortholog); Top expressed in: ventricular zone; ganglionic eminence; appendix; body of pancreas; smooth muscle tissue; Achilles tendon; left ovary; right ovary; epithelium of colon; sural nerve / Top expressed in: tail of embryo; yolk sac; epiblast; genital tubercle; neural layer of retina; primary oocyte; secondary oocyte; zygote; ventricular zone; placenta; More reference expression data
BioGPS	More reference expression data
Gene ontology
Molecular function	DNA binding; telomeric DNA binding; protein C-terminus binding; protein binding; RNA binding; identical protein binding; nucleic acid binding; DNA topoisomerase binding; mRNA 5'-UTR binding
Cellular component	cytoplasm; membrane; nucleoplasm; cell cortex; nucleolus; cytoplasmic ribonucleoprotein granule; extracellular exosome; nucleus; ribonucleoprotein complex
Biological process	positive regulation of transcription of nucleolar large rRNA by RNA polymerase I; angiogenesis; positive regulation of transcription by RNA polymerase II; cellular response to epidermal growth factor stimulus; negative regulation of translation; cellular response to leukemia inhibitory factor
Sources:Amigo / QuickGO
Orthologs
Databases	NCBI: entry; OMA: entry
Species	Human	Mouse
Entrez	4691	17975
Ensembl	ENSG00000115053	ENSMUSG00000026234
UniProt	P19338	P09405
RefSeq (mRNA)	NM_005381	NM_010880
RefSeq (protein)	NP_005372	NP_035010
Location (UCSC)	Chr 2: 231.45 – 231.48 Mb	Chr 1: 86.27 – 86.29 Mb
PubMed search
- Wikidata
View/Edit Human	View/Edit Mouse

Nucleolin is a protein that in humans is encoded by the NCL gene.

== Gene ==
The human NCL gene is located on chromosome 2 and consists of 14 exons with 13 introns and spans approximately 11kb. Intron 11 of the NCL gene encodes a small nucleolar RNA, termed U20.

== Function ==
Nucleolin is the major nucleolar protein of growing eukaryotic cells. It is found associated with intranucleolar chromatin and pre-ribosomal particles. It induces chromatin decondensation by binding to histone H1. It is thought to play a role in pre-rRNA transcription and ribosome assembly. It may play a role in the process of transcriptional elongation. It binds RNA oligonucleotides with 5'-UUAGGG-3' repeats more tightly than the telomeric single-stranded DNA 5'-TTAGGG-3' repeats.

Nucleolin is also able to act as a transcriptional coactivator with Chicken Ovalbumin Upstream Promoter Transcription Factor II (COUP-TFII).

== Clinical significance ==
Midkine and pleiotrophin bind to cell-surface nucleolin as a low affinity receptor. This binding can inhibit HIV infection.

Nucleolin at the cell surface is the receptor for the respiratory syncytial virus (RSV) fusion protein. Interference with the nucleolin–RSV fusion protein interaction has been shown to be therapeutic against RSV infection in cell cultures and animal models.

== Interactions ==
Nucleolin has been shown to interact with:

- MTDH,
- CSNK2A2,
- Centaurin, alpha 1,
- HuR,
- NPM1,
- P53,
- PPP1CB,
- S100A11,
- Sjögren syndrome antigen B,
- TOP1, and
- Telomerase reverse transcriptase.
