= S100A2 =

Protein-coding gene in the species Homo sapiens

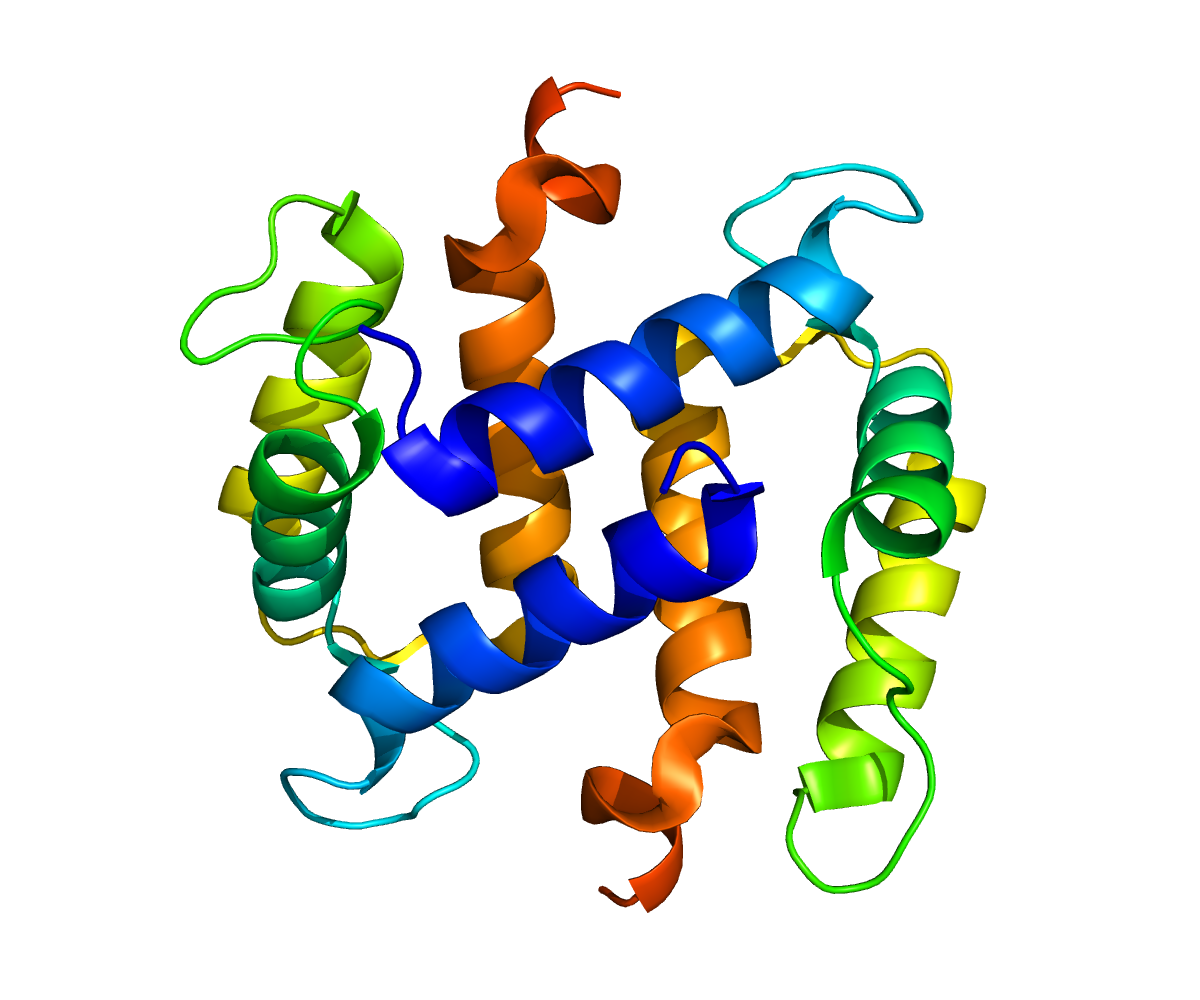

Identifiers
- Aliases: S100A2, CAN19, S100L, S100 calcium binding protein A2
- External IDs: OMIM: 176993; GeneCards: S100A2
Available structures
PDB	Human UniProt search: PDBe RCSB
PDB	List of PDB id codes 2RGI, 4DUQ
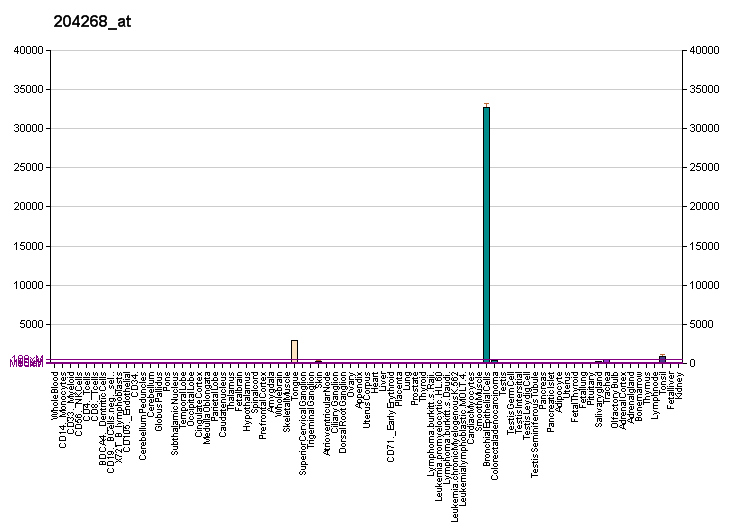
RNA expression pattern
Bgee	Human / Mouse (ortholog); Top expressed in: hair follicle; oral cavity; body of tongue; periodontal fiber; human penis; vulva; mucosa of urinary bladder; skin of abdomen; trachea; nipple / n/a; More reference expression data
BioGPS	More reference expression data
Gene ontology
Molecular function	metal ion binding; calcium ion binding; identical protein binding; protein binding; transition metal ion binding
Cellular component	cellular component
Biological process	endothelial cell migration
Sources:Amigo / QuickGO
Orthologs
Databases	NCBI: entry
Species	Human	Mouse
Entrez	6273	n/a
Ensembl	n/a	n/a
UniProt	P29034	n/a
RefSeq (mRNA)	NM_005978; NM_001366406; NM_001366407	n/a
RefSeq (protein)	NP_005969; NP_001353335; NP_001353336	n/a
Location (UCSC)	n/a	n/a
PubMed search		n/a
- Wikidata
View/Edit Human

S100 calcium-binding protein A2 (S100A2) is a protein that in humans is encoded by the S100A2 gene and it is located on chromosome 1q21 with other S100 proteins.

== Tissue and subcellular distribution ==
S100A2, also known as CaN19 or S100L, was first isolated from bovine lung tissue. However, in human tissue it was discovered several years later, in the mammary epithelial cells. Under normal circumstances it is highly expressed in human lungs, prostate, kidneys, hair follicles and salivary and mammary glands. S100A2 is predominantly found in the nucleus, which is not very common in other S100 proteins. Moreover, it can also be found in the cytoplasm, and its distribution is rather diffuse. Its occurrence in cytoplasm is most likely dependent on calcium levels in the cell. In the extracellular environment, it can be found as a homodimer in vivo and in vitro, but it also exists in monomeric, polymeric and multimeric forms. In multimeric form, it functions as a RAGE receptor ligand.

== Function ==
S100A2 is important in cytoskeleton organization. Also, S100A2 is induced by p53, which it interacts and participates in the transcription of p21. It also plays a role in differentiation, regeneration of tissues and healing and it was shown it attract eosinophils by chemotaxis.

== Clinical significance ==
Its expression is reduced in many types of cancer, thereby distinguishing the cancerous expression profile of the other proteins of the S100 group. It has been reported that S100A2 is downregulated in lung, kidney, prostate cancer and melanoma. Chromosomal rearrangements and altered expression of this gene have also been implicated in breast cancer. In addition, its decline is associated with poor prognosis, disease progression, increased occurrence of metastasis and increased patient mortality. Although in most cancers it has been found in reduced levels, there are studies that show that in some cases it is overproduced.
