= S100A6 =

Human protein and coding gene

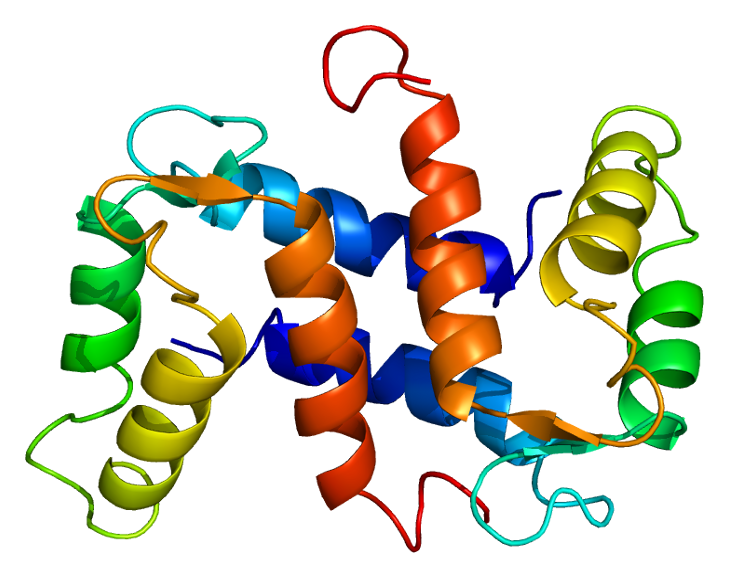

Identifiers
- Aliases: S100A6, 2A9, 5B10, CABP, CACY, PRA, S100 calcium binding protein A6, S10A6
- External IDs: OMIM: 114110; MGI: 1339467; GeneCards: S100A6
Available structures
PDB	Ortholog search: PDBe RCSB
PDB	List of PDB id codes 1K8U, 1K96, 1K9K, 1K9P, 2M1K, 4YBH

Gene location (Human)
Chr.	Chromosome 1 (human)
Band	1q21.3	Start	153,534,599 bp
Band	1q21.3	End	153,536,244 bp

Gene location (Mouse)
Chr.	Chromosome 3 (mouse)
Band	3 F1|3 39.35 cM	Start	90,520,189 bp
Band	3 F1|3 39.35 cM	End	90,531,488 bp
RNA expression pattern
Bgee	Human / Mouse (ortholog); Top expressed in: Achilles tendon; mucosa of transverse colon; ascending aorta; upper lobe of left lung; Descending thoracic aorta; right coronary artery; left coronary artery; right lung; olfactory zone of nasal mucosa; tibial nerve / Top expressed in: corneal stroma; transitional epithelium of urinary bladder; left colon; decidua; gastrula; granulocyte; endothelial cell of lymphatic vessel; umbilical cord; mucous cell of stomach; skin of external ear; More reference expression data
BioGPS	n/a
Gene ontology
Molecular function	calcium ion binding; S100 protein binding; protein homodimerization activity; ion transmembrane transporter activity; zinc ion binding; metal ion binding; calcium-dependent protein binding; protein binding; tropomyosin binding
Cellular component	cytoplasm; cytosol; nuclear envelope; membrane; ruffle; extrinsic component of cytoplasmic side of plasma membrane; plasma membrane; perinuclear region of cytoplasm; extracellular exosome; nucleus; extracellular region; collagen-containing extracellular matrix
Biological process	axonogenesis; positive regulation of fibroblast proliferation; ion transmembrane transport; signal transduction
Sources:Amigo / QuickGO
Orthologs
Databases	NCBI: entry; OMA: entry
Species	Human	Mouse
Entrez	6277	20200
Ensembl	ENSG00000197956	ENSMUSG00000001025
UniProt	P06703	P14069
RefSeq (mRNA)	NM_014624	NM_011313
RefSeq (protein)	NP_055439	NP_035443
Location (UCSC)	Chr 1: 153.53 – 153.54 Mb	Chr 3: 90.52 – 90.53 Mb
PubMed search
- Wikidata
View/Edit Human	View/Edit Mouse

S100 calcium-binding protein A6 (S100A6) is a protein that in humans is encoded by the S100A6 gene.

== Function ==
The protein encoded by this gene is a member of the S100 family of proteins containing 2 EF-hand calcium-binding motifs. S100 proteins are localized in the cytoplasm and/or nucleus of a wide range of cells, and involved in the regulation of a number of cellular processes such as cell cycle progression and differentiation. S100 genes include at least 13 members which are located as a cluster on chromosome 1q21. This protein may function in stimulation of Ca2+-dependent insulin release, stimulation of prolactin secretion, and exocytosis. Chromosomal rearrangements and altered expression of this gene have been implicated in melanoma.

== Interactions ==
S100A6 has been shown to interact with S100B and SUGT1.

== Pathology ==
S100A6 to be reported as possible diagnostic marker of papillary thyroid carcinoma.
