= S100A11 =

Protein found in humans

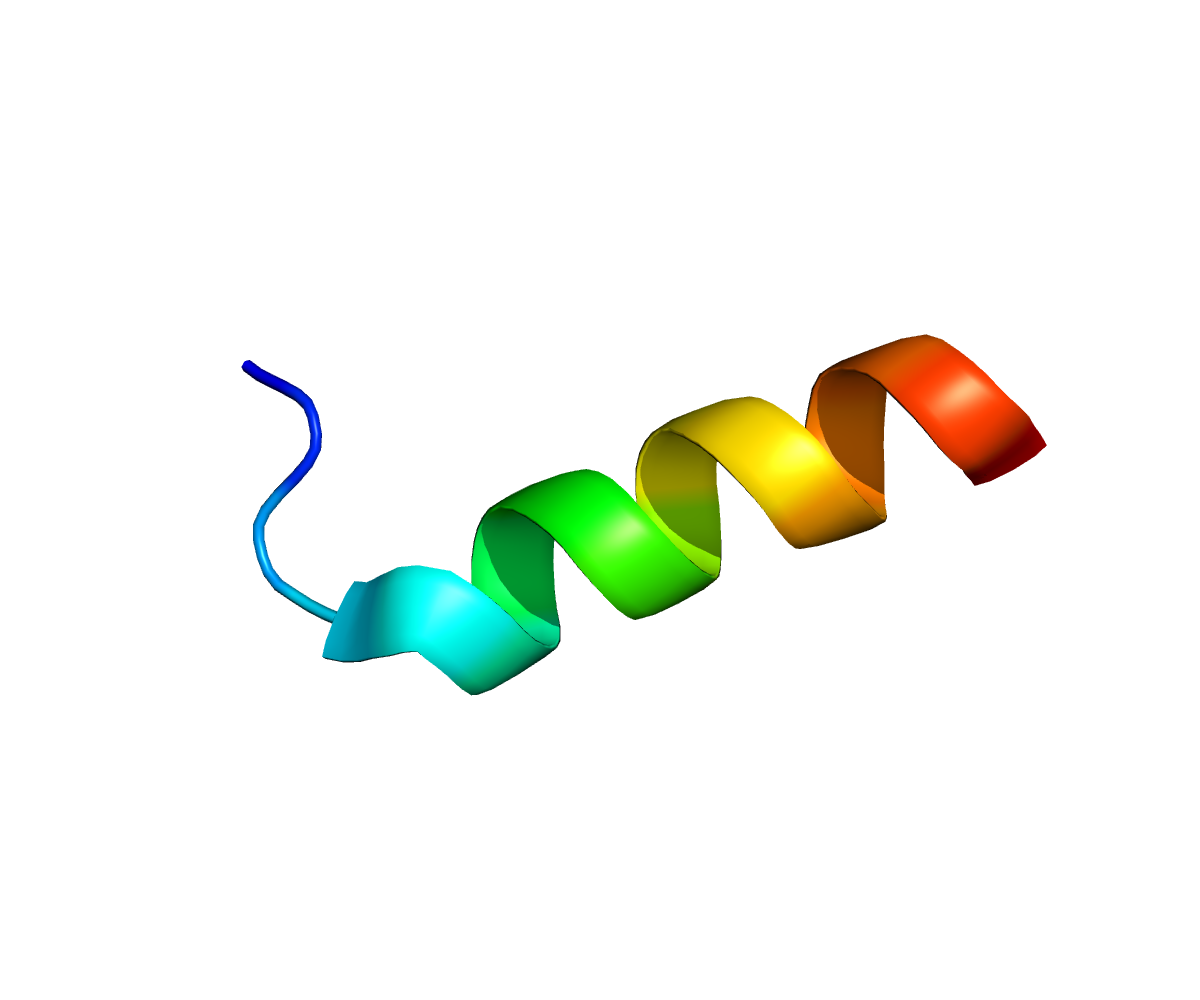

Identifiers
- Aliases: S100A11, HEL-S-43, MLN70, S100C, S100 calcium binding protein A11
- External IDs: OMIM: 603114; MGI: 3645720; GeneCards: S100A11
Available structures
PDB	Human UniProt search: PDBe RCSB
PDB	List of PDB id codes 1V4Z, 1V50, 2LUC

Gene location (Human)
Chr.	Chromosome 1 (human)
Band	1q21.3	Start	152,032,506 bp
Band	1q21.3	End	152,047,907 bp
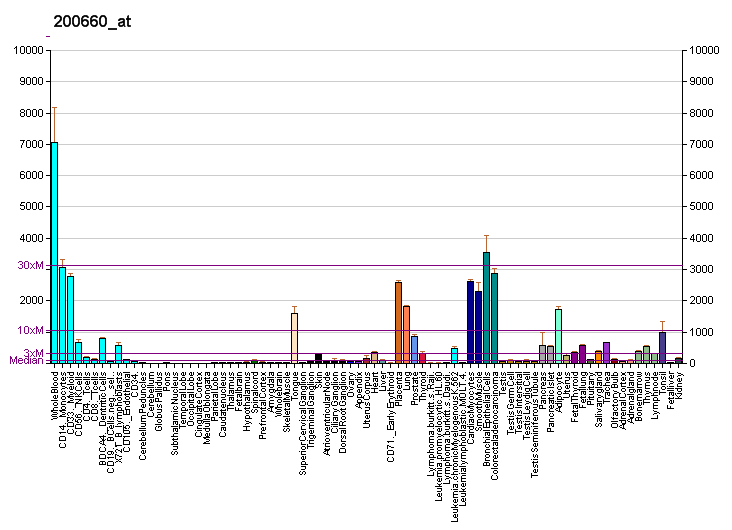
RNA expression pattern
Bgee	Human / Mouse (ortholog); Top expressed in: olfactory zone of nasal mucosa; monocyte; nasal epithelium; minor salivary glands; oral cavity; right uterine tube; Descending thoracic aorta; granulocyte; mucosa of pharynx; left coronary artery / n/a; More reference expression data
BioGPS	More reference expression data
Gene ontology
Molecular function	protein binding; calcium ion binding; calcium-dependent protein binding; protein homodimerization activity; metal ion binding; S100 protein binding; cadherin binding involved in cell-cell adhesion
Cellular component	nucleus; ruffle; extracellular exosome; cytoplasm; extracellular space; secretory granule lumen; extracellular region
Biological process	negative regulation of cell population proliferation; negative regulation of DNA replication; signal transduction; regulation of cell population proliferation; cell-cell adhesion; neutrophil degranulation
Sources:Amigo / QuickGO
Orthologs
Databases	NCBI: entry; OMA: entry
Species	Human	Mouse
Entrez	6282	277089
Ensembl	ENSG00000163191	ENSMUSG00000066457
UniProt	P31949	n/a
RefSeq (mRNA)	NM_005620	n/a
RefSeq (protein)	NP_005611	n/a
Location (UCSC)	Chr 1: 152.03 – 152.05 Mb	n/a
PubMed search
- Wikidata
View/Edit Human	View/Edit Mouse

S100 calcium-binding protein A11 (S100A11) is a protein that in humans is encoded by the S100A11 gene.

== Function ==
The protein encoded by this gene is a member of the S100 family of proteins containing 2 EF-hand calcium-binding motifs. S100A11, also known as calgizzarin or 100C, is a small acidic protein. Along with all 13 members of the S100 family, are located as a cluster on chromosome 1q21. It was first found in 1989, and later isolated from chicken gizzard muscles.

The protein may function in motility, invasion, and tubulin polymerization. Chromosomal rearrangements and altered expression of this gene have been implicated in tumor metastasis.

Its high expression has been found in many tissues including lung, pancreas, heart, placenta, kidney, and low levels in skeletal muscle, liver, and brain tissue.

S100A11 is implicated in membrane and cytoskeletal dynamics, vesicular transportation and processes of endo and exocytosis. It has been shown that S100A11 interacts with many cytoskeletal structures as tubulin, actin, intermediate filaments also with annexin I and annexin II. S100A11 is able to control reorganization of actin and it is important in forming protrusion by metastatic cells.

It lacks enzymatic activity, it functions by binding to other proteins, it regulates activity of other enzymes. It is associated with cell cycle, growth, survival and apoptosis. It has been identified as dual growth mediator. Suppression of S100A11 by small interfering RNA caused cells to apoptosis, and overexpression of S100A11 has been found to inhibit apoptosis in tumor cells. Furthermore, the knock-down of S100A11 via siRNA reduces the sister-chromatid exchange and the viability of cells.

== S100A11 in pathologies ==
IL-8 and TNF-alpha induce the expression and release of S100A11 in chondrocytes in culture and exogenous S100A11 causes chondrocyte hypertrophy. S100A11 could play a role in maintaining low-grade inflammation in osteoarthritis and in its progression.

Its cellular localization is associated with the regulation of cell growth and proliferation. This protein is normally found strictly in the nucleus, but appears in the cytoplasm in cancer cells. S100A11 was localized in the cytoplasm of resting human keratinocytes in vitro.

It has been shown to interact with the RAGE receptor, which is also a receptor for other S100 proteins.

It is associated with low or high production in many different types of cancers. Its overproduction has been found, for example, in breast, pancreas or colectal carcinoma and its levels can be used as clinical marker in these diseases.

It has been shown that S100A11 enhances the recombination activity of human RAD51 in vitro. A knock-down leads to diffuse distribution of RAD54B. These finding suggest a potential role of S100A11 in the process of homologous recombination repair of double-strand breaks.

Usually, S100A11 makes homodimeres, but it has been shown that S100A11 heterodimerizes with S100B and it also interacts with Nucleolin, and RAD54B.
