= AHNAK =

Protein-coding gene in humans

Identifiers
- Aliases: AHNAK, AHNAKRS, AHNAK nucleoprotein, PM227
- External IDs: OMIM: 103390; MGI: 1316648; GeneCards: AHNAK
Available structures
PDB	Human UniProt search: PDBe RCSB
PDB	List of PDB id codes 4DRW, 4FTG, 4HRG

Gene location (Human)
Chr.	Chromosome 11 (human)
Band	11q12.3	Start	62,433,542 bp
Band	11q12.3	End	62,556,235 bp

Gene location (Mouse)
Chr.	Chromosome 19 (mouse)
Band	19|19 A	Start	8,966,648 bp
Band	19|19 A	End	9,054,278 bp
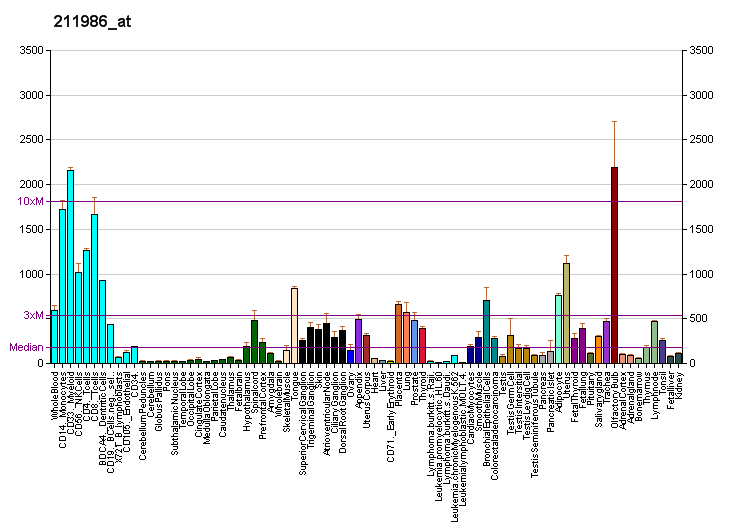
RNA expression pattern
Bgee	Human / Mouse (ortholog); Top expressed in: olfactory bulb; Achilles tendon; tendon of biceps brachii; trigeminal ganglion; saphenous vein; mucosa of pharynx; nipple; epithelium of colon; urethra; skin of hip / Top expressed in: sciatic nerve; ascending aorta; corneal stroma; aortic valve; gastrula; skin of external ear; right lung lobe; conjunctival fornix; endothelial cell of lymphatic vessel; tunica media of zone of aorta; More reference expression data
BioGPS	More reference expression data
Gene ontology
Molecular function	S100 protein binding; structural molecule activity conferring elasticity; protein binding; RNA binding; cadherin binding
Cellular component	cytoplasm; vesicle; cytosol; membrane; cell-cell contact zone; focal adhesion; plasma membrane; lysosomal membrane; actin cytoskeleton; membrane raft; sarcolemma; costamere; extracellular exosome; nucleus; T-tubule
Biological process	regulation of voltage-gated calcium channel activity; regulation of RNA splicing; protein complex oligomerization
Sources:Amigo / QuickGO
Orthologs
Databases	NCBI: entry; OMA: entry
Species	Human	Mouse
Entrez	79026	66395
Ensembl	ENSG00000124942	ENSMUSG00000069833
UniProt	Q09666	n/a
RefSeq (mRNA)	NM_001620; NM_024060; NM_001346445; NM_001346446	NM_001039959; NM_001286518; NM_009643; NM_175108
RefSeq (protein)	NP_001333374; NP_001333375; NP_001611; NP_076965	n/a
Location (UCSC)	Chr 11: 62.43 – 62.56 Mb	Chr 19: 8.97 – 9.05 Mb
PubMed search
- Wikidata
View/Edit Human	View/Edit Mouse

Neuroblast differentiation-associated protein AHNAK, also known as desmoyokin, is a protein that in humans is encoded by the AHNAK gene. AHNAK was originally identified in 1989 (in bovine muzzle epidermal cells) and named desmoyokin due to its localization pattern (that resembled a yoke) in the desmosomal plaque. AHNAK has been shown to be essential for pseudopod protrusion and cell migration.

== Interactions ==
AHNAK has been shown to interact with S100B.
