= S100 protein =

Family of vertebrate proteins involved in cell division and inflammation

S100/ICaBP type calcium binding domain
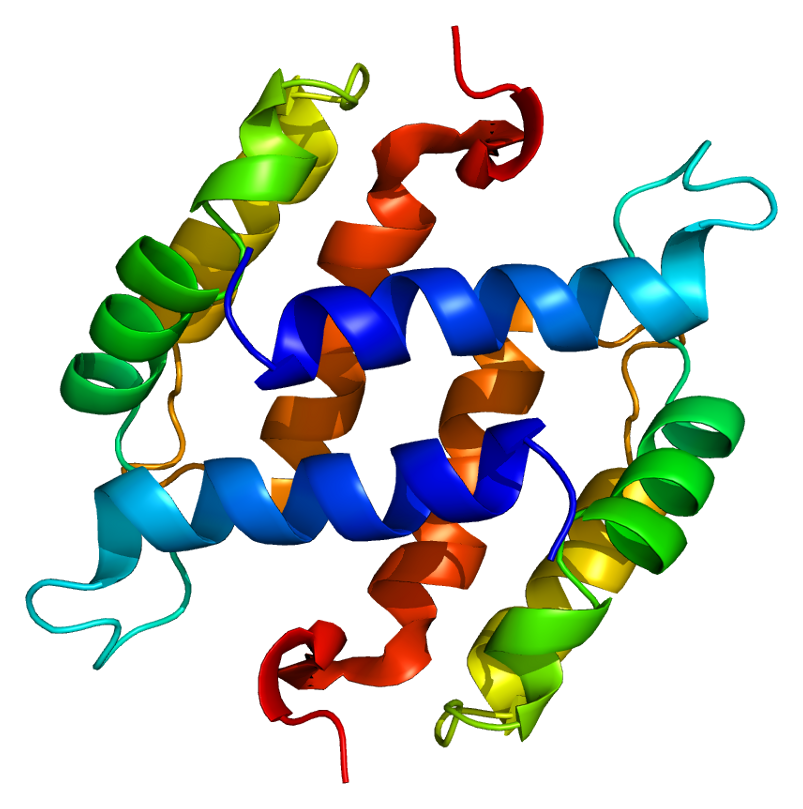
- Structure of the S100B protein. Based on PyMOL rendering of PDB 1b4c.

Identifiers
- Symbol: S_100
- Pfam: PF01023
- InterPro: IPR013787
- PROSITE: PDOC00275
- SCOP2: 1cnp / SCOPe / SUPFAM
Available protein structures:
- PDB: 1yutB:9-52 1yuuA:9-52 1yusB:9-52 1yurA:9-52 1k8uA:5-50 1k9pA:5-50 1k96A:5-50 1k9kA:5-50 1cnpB:5-50 1a03A:5-50 2cnpB:5-50 1jwdB:5-50 1m31A:5-48 1k2hB:5-48 1cfpB:4-47 1psbA:4-47 1mho :4-47 1uwoA:4-47 1mq1B:4-47 1b4cB:4-47 1symA:4-47 1qlkB:4-47 1xydB:4-47 1dt7B:4-47 1mwnA:4-47 1j55A:4-47 1ozoA:4-47 1ksoA:5-48 1irjH:8-51 1xk4K:8-51 1gqmI:4-47 1odbD:4-47 1e8aB:4-47 1clb :5-46 1ig5A:5-46 2bca :5-46 1qx2B:5-46 1bod :5-46 1b1gA:5-46 1kcyA:5-46 1ht9A:5-46 2bcb :5-46 1n65A:5-46 1boc :5-46 3icb :5-46 1kqvA:5-46 1ksmA:5-46 1cdn :5-46 4icb :5-46 1igvA:5-46 1d1oA:5-46 1cb1 :4-46 1a4pB:5-45 1bt6A:5-45 1nshB:7-50 1v4zA:10-19 1v50A:10-19 1qlsA:8-51 1mr8B:5-48 1psrB:6-46 2psr :6-46 3psrA:6-46 IPR013787 PF01023 (ECOD; PDBsum)
- AlphaFold: IPR013787; PF01023

The S100 proteins are a family of low molecular-weight proteins found in vertebrates characterized by two calcium-binding sites that have helix-loop-helix ("EF-hand-type") conformation. At least 21 different S100 proteins are known. They are encoded by a family of genes whose symbols use the S100 prefix, for example, S100A1, S100A2, S100A3. They are also considered as damage-associated molecular pattern molecules (DAMPs), and knockdown of aryl hydrocarbon receptor downregulates the expression of S100 proteins in THP-1 cells.

== Structure ==
Most S100 proteins consist of two identical polypeptides (homodimeric), which are held together by noncovalent bonds. They are structurally similar to calmodulin. They differ from calmodulin, though, on the other features. For instance, their expression pattern is cell-specific, i.e. they are expressed in particular cell types. Their expression depends on environmental factors. In contrast, calmodulin is a ubiquitous and universal intracellular Ca^{2+} receptor widely expressed in many cells.

== Normal function ==
S100 proteins are normally present in cells derived from the neural crest (Schwann cells, and melanocytes), chondrocytes, adipocytes, myoepithelial cells, macrophages, Langerhans cells, dendritic cells, and keratinocytes. They may be present in some breast epithelial cells.

S100 proteins have been implicated in a variety of intracellular and extracellular functions, such as regulation of protein phosphorylation, transcription factors, Ca^{2+} homeostasis, the dynamics of cytoskeleton constituents, enzyme activities, cell growth and differentiation, and the inflammatory response. S100A7 (psoriasin) and S100A15 have been found to act as cytokines in inflammation, particularly in autoimmune skin conditions such as psoriasis.

== Pathology ==
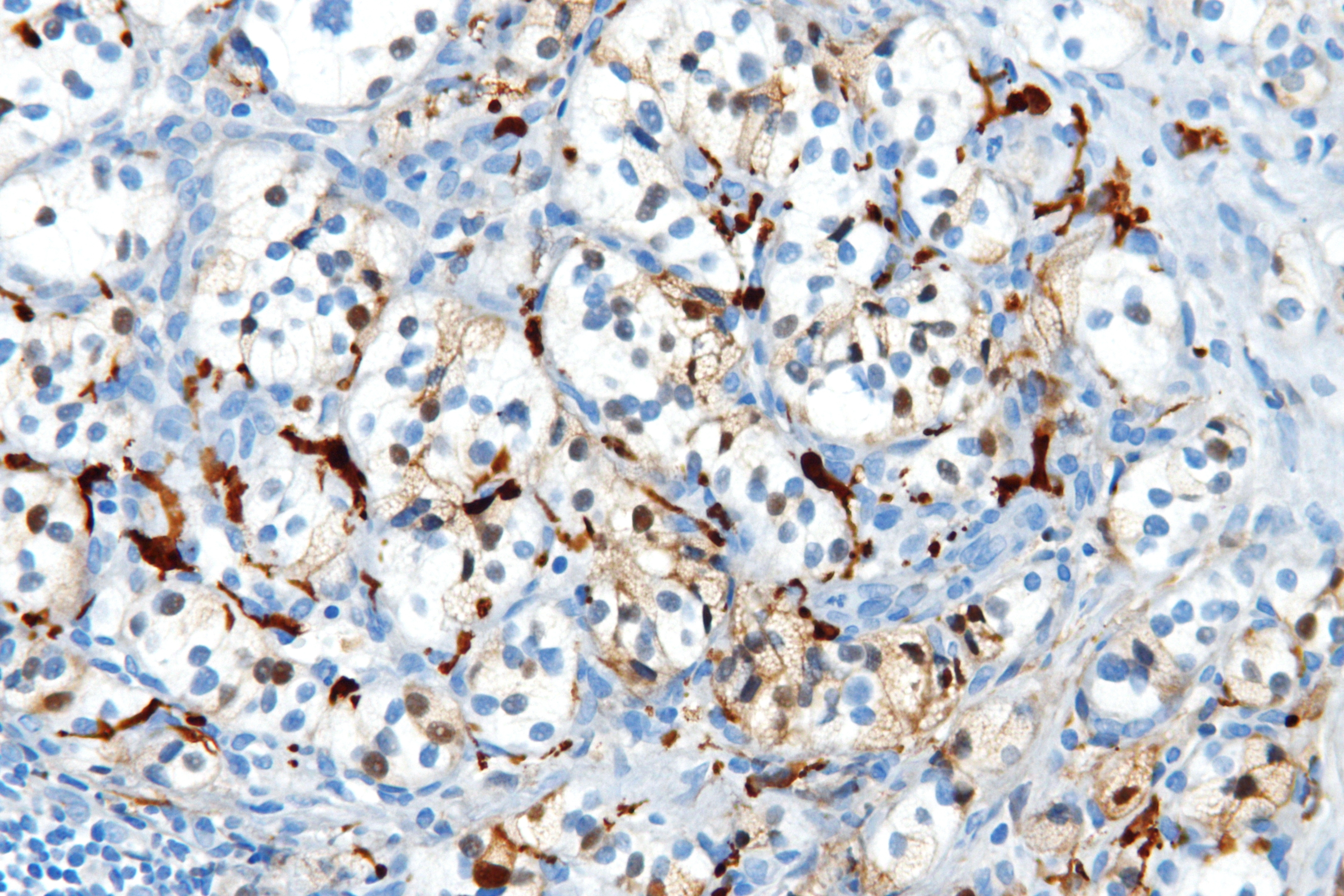
S100 immunostain marking the sustentacular cells in a paraganglioma

Several members of the S100 protein family are useful as markers for certain tumors and epidermal differentiation. They can be found in melanomas, 100% of schwannomas, 100% of neurofibromas (weaker than schwannomas), 50% of malignant peripheral nerve sheath tumors (may be weak and/or focal), paraganglioma stromal cells, histiocytoma, and clear-cell sarcomas. Further, S100 proteins are markers for inflammatory diseases and can mediate inflammation and act as antimicrobials. S100 proteins have been used in the lab as cell markers for anatomic pathology.

== Human genes ==
- S100A1, S100A2, S100A3, S100A4, S100A5, S100A6, S100A7 (psoriasin), S100A7A (koebnerisin), S100A8 (calgranulin A), S100A9 (calgranulin B), S100A10, S100A11, S100A12 (calgranulin C), S100A13, S100A14, S100A16
- S100B, S100G, S100P, S100Z (S100Z)
- CRNN, FLG, FLG2, HRNR, RPTN, TCHH, THHL1

== Nomenclature ==
The "S100" symbol prefix denotes that these proteins are soluble in 100%, i.e. saturated, ammonium sulfate at neutral pH. The symbol has often been hyphenated, but current gene and protein nomenclature, such as HUGO Gene Nomenclature Committee nomenclature, does not use hyphens in symbols.

== See also ==
- List of histologic stains that aid in diagnosis of cutaneous conditions
- Calprotectin
