= S100A7 =

Protein found in humans

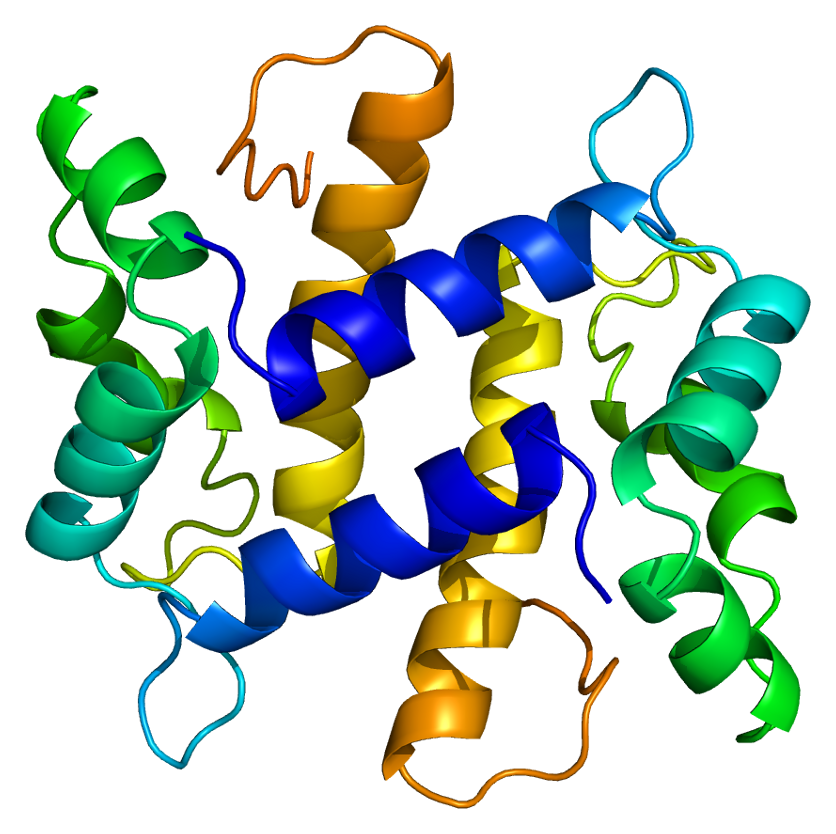

Identifiers
- Aliases: S100A7, PSOR1, S100A7c, S100 calcium binding protein A7
- External IDs: OMIM: 600353; GeneCards: S100A7
Available structures
| PDB | Human UniProt search: PDBe RCSB |
| PDB | List of PDB id codes 1PSR, 2PSR, 2WND, 2WOR, 2WOS, 3PSR, 4AQJ |

Gene location (Human)
| Chr. | Chromosome 1 (human) |
| Band | 1q21.3 | Start | 153,457,744 bp |
| Band | 1q21.3 | End | 153,460,651 bp |
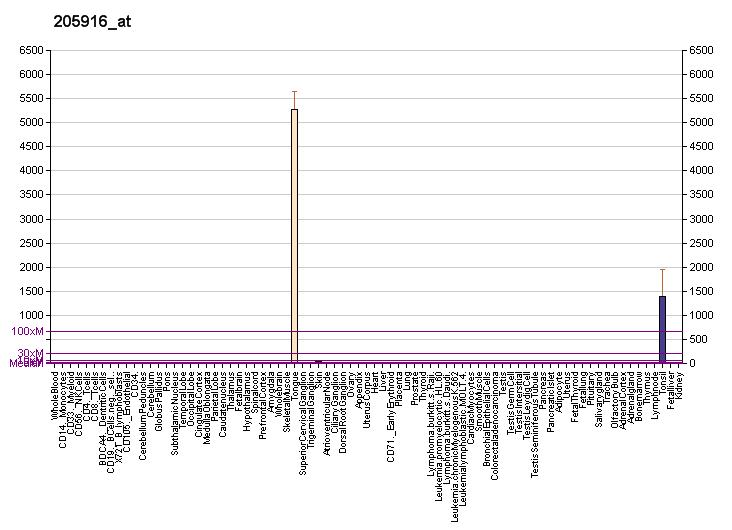
RNA expression pattern
| Bgee | Human / Mouse (ortholog); Top expressed in: skin of abdomen; skin of leg; testicle; vagina; epithelium of bronchus; tonsil; thymus; ectocervix; minor salivary glands; cerebellar hemisphere / n/a; More reference expression data |
| BioGPS | More reference expression data |
Gene ontology
| Molecular function | calcium ion binding; zinc ion binding; metal ion binding; protein binding; RAGE receptor binding; transition metal ion binding |
| Cellular component | cytoplasm; cytosol; focal adhesion; extracellular region; endoplasmic reticulum; nucleus; azurophil granule lumen; extracellular space; extracellular matrix; collagen-containing extracellular matrix |
| Biological process | response to reactive oxygen species; positive regulation of monocyte chemotaxis; keratinocyte differentiation; positive regulation of granulocyte chemotaxis; sequestering of metal ion; response to lipopolysaccharide; positive regulation of T cell chemotaxis; angiogenesis; positive regulation of ERK1 and ERK2 cascade; epidermis development; innate immune response; antimicrobial humoral response; neutrophil degranulation; antimicrobial humoral immune response mediated by antimicrobial peptide |
Sources:Amigo / QuickGO
Orthologs
| Databases | NCBI: entry; OMA: entry |
| Species | Human | Mouse |
| Entrez | 6278 | n/a |
| Ensembl | ENSG00000143556 | n/a |
| UniProt | P31151 | n/a |
| RefSeq (mRNA) | NM_002963 | n/a |
| RefSeq (protein) | NP_002954 | n/a |
| Location (UCSC) | Chr 1: 153.46 – 153.46 Mb | n/a |
| PubMed search | | n/a |
- Wikidata
| View/Edit Human |

S100 calcium-binding protein A7 (S100A7), also known as psoriasin, is a protein that in humans is encoded by the S100A7 gene.

== Function ==
S100A7 is a member of the S100 family of proteins containing 2 EF-hand calcium-binding motifs. S100 proteins are localized in the cytoplasm and/or nucleus of a wide range of cells, and involved in the regulation of a number of cellular processes such as cell cycle progression and differentiation. S100 genes include at least 13 members which are located as a cluster on chromosome 1q21. This protein differs from the other S100 proteins of known structure in its lack of calcium binding ability in one EF-hand at the N-terminus. The protein functions as a prominent antimicrobial peptide mainly against E. coli.

S100A7 also displays antimicrobial properties. It is secreted by epithelial cells of the skin and is a key antimicrobial protein against Escherichia coli by disrupting their cell membranes. This is the reason that in countries with poor sanitation, human skin is exposed to E. coli strains from faecal matter but it does not usually result in an infection.

S100A7 is highly homologous to S100A7A (koebnerisin) but distinct in expression, tissue distribution and function.

== Clinical significance ==
This protein is markedly over-expressed in the skin lesions of psoriatic patients, but is excluded as a candidate gene for familial psoriasis susceptibility. The expression of psoriasin is induced in skin wounds through activation of the epidermal growth factor receptor.

== Interactions ==
S100A7 has been shown to interact with COP9 constitutive photomorphogenic homolog subunit 5, FABP5 and RANBP9.

S100A7 interacts with RAGE (receptor of advanced glycated end products).
