= Faecal calprotectin =

Measurement of calprotectin protein in stool

- Purpose: biochemical measurement of the protein calprotectin in the stool

Faecal calprotectin (or fecal calprotectin) is a biochemical measurement of the protein calprotectin in the stool. Elevated faecal calprotectin indicates the migration of neutrophils to the intestinal mucosa, which occurs during intestinal inflammation, including inflammation caused by inflammatory bowel disease. Under a specific clinical scenario, the test may eliminate the need for invasive colonoscopy or radio-labelled white cell scanning.

== Structure and function ==
Calprotectin is a 24 kDa protein dimer of S100A8 and S100A9. The complex accounts for up to 60% of the soluble protein content of the neutrophil cytosol. In vitro studies show that calprotectin has bacteriostatic and fungistatic properties, that arise from the ability to sequester manganese and zinc ions. Calprotectin has two transition metal binding sites that form at the interface of the S100A8 and S100A9 monomers, and metal sequestration by calprotectin has been shown to be calcium dependent. The complex is resistant to enzymatic degradation, and can be easily measured in faeces.

== Use as a surrogate marker ==
Reference ranges for calprotectin
Patient age	Upper limit	Unit
2–9 years	166	μg/g of faeces
10–59 years	51	μg/g of faeces
≥ 60 years	112	μg/g of faeces

The main diseases that cause an increased excretion of faecal calprotectin are inflammatory bowel diseases (IBD), coeliac disease, infectious colitis, necrotizing enterocolitis in infants, intestinal cystic fibrosis and colorectal cancer.

Faecal calprotectin is regularly used as indicator for IBD during treatment and as a diagnostic marker. IBD are a group of conditions that cause a pathological inflammation of the bowel wall. Crohn's disease and ulcerative colitis are the principal types of inflammatory bowel disease. Inflammatory processes result in an influx of neutrophils into the bowel lumen. Since calprotectin comprises as much as 60% of the soluble protein content of the cytosol of neutrophils, it can serve as a marker for the level of intestinal inflammation. Measurement of faecal calprotectin has been shown to be strongly correlated with 111-indium-labelled leucocytes – considered the gold standard measurement of intestinal inflammation.

Levels of faecal calprotectin are usually normal in patients with irritable bowel syndrome (IBS). In untreated coeliac disease, concentration levels of faecal calprotectin correlate with the degree of intestinal mucosal lesion and normalize with a gluten-free diet. High fecal calprotectin is a common finding among hospitalized coronavirus disease 2019 (COVID-19) patients, especially those with SARS-CoV-2 fecal shedding.

Faecal calprotectin is measured using immunochemical techniques such as ELISA or immunochromatographic assays. The antibodies used in these assays target specific epitopes of the calprotectin molecule.

Increased faecal calprotectin may be indicative of intestinal tuberculosis or pulmonary tuberculosis.

== False-positive measurements ==
Although faecal calprotectin correlates significantly with disease activity in people with confirmed IBD, faecal calprotectin can be false-positive if the laboratory uses low calprotectin cut-off levels. Most importantly, intake of non-steroidal anti-inflammatory drugs (aspirin included) increases calprotectin values, possibly due to the associated induced enteropathy.

== See also ==
- Calgranulin
