= RAGE (receptor) =

Protein-coding gene in the species Homo sapiens

AGER

Identifiers
- Aliases: AGER, Ager, RAGE, SCARJ1, advanced glycosylation end product-specific receptor, advanced glycosylation end-product specific receptor, sRAGE
- External IDs: OMIM: 600214; MGI: 893592; GeneCards: AGER
Available structures
PDB	Ortholog search: PDBe RCSB
PDB	List of PDB id codes 2ENS, 2M1K, 2LE9, 4LP5, 2MOV, 3O3U, 2LMB, 4LP4, 4OF5, 4OI8, 4XYN, 2MJW, 2E5E, 2L7U, 3CJJ, 4OFV, 4P2Y, 4OI7, 4YBH,%%s1PWI, 2BJP, 2E5E, 2ENS, 2L7U, 2LE9, 2LMB, 2M1K, 2MJW, 2MOV, 3CJJ, 3O3U, 4LP4, 4LP5, 4OF5, 4OFV, 4OI7, 4OI8, 4P2Y, 4XYN

Gene location (Human)
Chr.	Chromosome 6 (human)
Band	6p21.32	Start	32,180,968 bp
Band	6p21.32	End	32,184,322 bp

Gene location (Mouse)
Chr.	Chromosome 17 (mouse)
Band	17|17 B1	Start	34,816,836 bp
Band	17|17 B1	End	34,819,910 bp
RNA expression pattern
Bgee	Human / Mouse (ortholog); Top expressed in: right lung; upper lobe of left lung; right lobe of thyroid gland; left lobe of thyroid gland; granulocyte; spleen; blood; right uterine tube; gastric mucosa; lymph node / Top expressed in: right lung lobe; left lung; left lung lobe; granulocyte; thyroid gland; trachea; morula; renal corpuscle; external carotid artery; renal pelvis; More reference expression data
BioGPS	n/a
Gene ontology
Molecular function	S100 protein binding; protein binding; identical protein binding; transmembrane signaling receptor activity; advanced glycation end-product binding; heparin binding; amyloid-beta binding; scavenger receptor activity; signaling receptor activity; advanced glycation end-product receptor activity; protein-containing complex binding
Cellular component	integral component of membrane; membrane; integral component of plasma membrane; extracellular region; fibrillar center; plasma membrane; cell junction; cell surface; apical plasma membrane; postsynapse
Biological process	negative regulation of interleukin-10 production; positive regulation of interleukin-12 production; cell surface receptor signaling pathway; response to wounding; positive regulation of NF-kappaB transcription factor activity; positive regulation of dendritic cell differentiation; innate immune response; inflammatory response; regulation of T cell mediated cytotoxicity; regulation of CD4-positive, alpha-beta T cell activation; positive regulation of activated T cell proliferation; negative regulation of advanced glycation end-product receptor activity; protein localization to membrane; positive regulation of JUN kinase activity; regulation of DNA binding; induction of positive chemotaxis; regulation of inflammatory response; response to hypoxia; astrocyte development; neuron projection development; negative regulation of connective tissue replacement involved in inflammatory response wound healing; positive regulation of monocyte chemotactic protein-1 production; positive regulation of protein phosphorylation; receptor-mediated endocytosis; learning or memory; glucose mediated signaling pathway; positive regulation of heterotypic cell-cell adhesion; transcytosis; positive regulation of JNK cascade; regulation of synaptic plasticity; positive regulation of astrocyte activation; positive regulation of ERK1 and ERK2 cascade; regulation of spontaneous synaptic transmission; regulation of long-term synaptic potentiation; negative regulation of long-term synaptic potentiation; negative regulation of long-term synaptic depression; regulation of p38MAPK cascade; positive regulation of p38MAPK cascade; regulation of NIK/NF-kappaB signaling; positive regulation of NIK/NF-kappaB signaling; positive regulation of aspartic-type endopeptidase activity involved in amyloid precursor protein catabolic process; negative regulation of blood circulation; positive regulation of microglial cell activation; response to amyloid-beta; cellular response to amyloid-beta; positive regulation of monocyte extravasation; endocytosis
Sources:Amigo / QuickGO
Orthologs
Databases	NCBI: entry; OMA: entry
Species	Human	Mouse
Entrez	177	11596
Ensembl	ENSG00000237405; ENSG00000206320; ENSG00000231268; ENSG00000234729; ENSG00000229058 ENSG00000204305; ENSG00000230514	ENSMUSG00000015452
UniProt	Q15109	Q62151
RefSeq (mRNA)	NM_001136; NM_001206929; NM_001206932; NM_001206934; NM_001206936 NM_001206940; NM_001206954; NM_001206966; NM_172197	NM_001271422; NM_001271423; NM_001271424; NM_007425
RefSeq (protein)	NP_001127; NP_001193858; NP_001193861; NP_001193863; NP_001193865 NP_001193869; NP_001193883; NP_001193895; NP_751947	NP_001258351; NP_001258352; NP_001258353; NP_031451
Location (UCSC)	Chr 6: 32.18 – 32.18 Mb	Chr 17: 34.82 – 34.82 Mb
PubMed search
- Wikidata
View/Edit Human	View/Edit Mouse

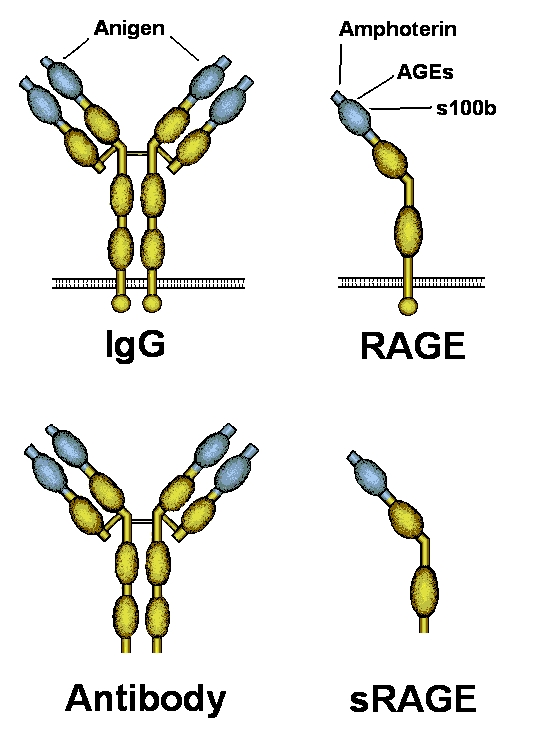
Schematic of the relation between an immunoglobulin and RAGE

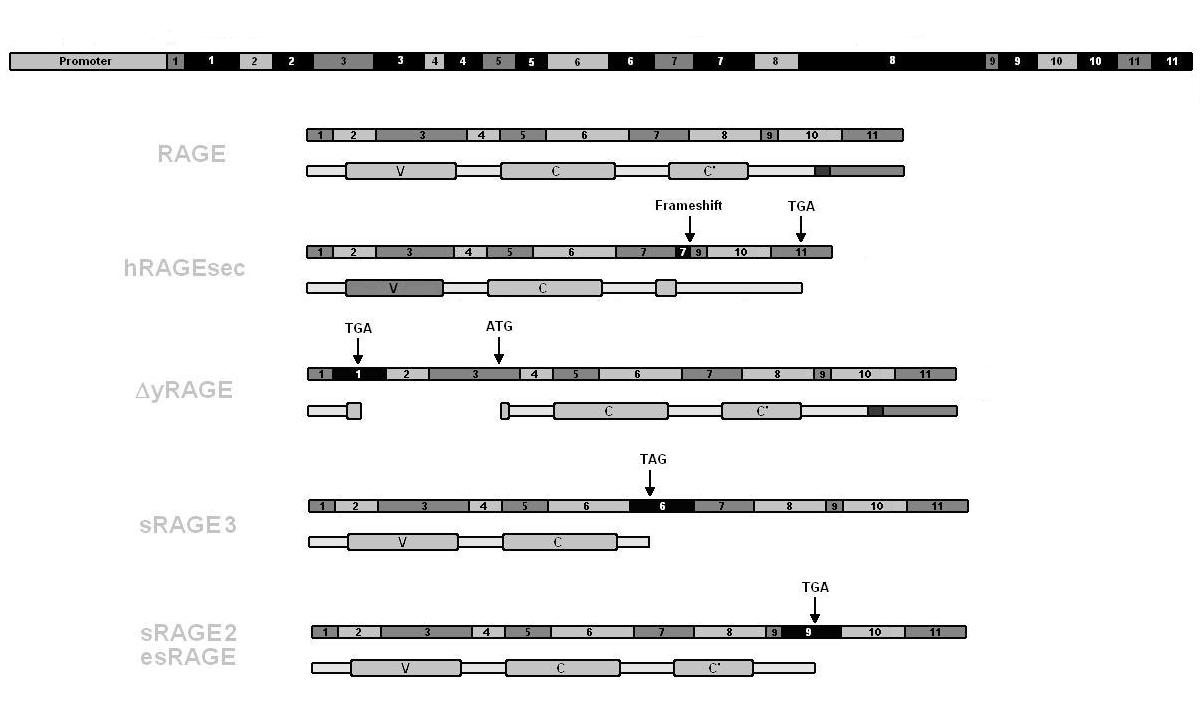
Schematic of the RAGE gene and its products

RAGE (receptor for advanced glycation end-products), also called AGER, is a 35 kilodalton transmembrane receptor of the immunoglobulin super family which was first characterized in 1992 by Neeper et al. Its name comes from its ability to bind advanced glycation end-products (AGEs), which include chiefly glycoproteins, the glycans of which have been modified non-enzymatically through the Maillard reaction. In view of its inflammatory function in innate immunity and its ability to detect a class of ligands through a common structural motif, RAGE is often referred to as a pattern recognition receptor. RAGE also has at least one other agonistic ligand: high mobility group protein B1 (HMGB1). HMGB1 is an intracellular DNA-binding protein important in chromatin remodeling which can be released by necrotic cells passively, and by active secretion from macrophages, natural killer cells, and dendritic cells.

The interaction between RAGE and its ligands is thought to result in pro-inflammatory gene activation. Due to an enhanced level of RAGE ligands in diabetes or other chronic disorders, this receptor is hypothesised to have a causative effect in a range of inflammatory diseases such as diabetic complications, Alzheimer's disease and even some tumors.

Isoforms of the RAGE protein, which lack the transmembrane and the signaling domain (commonly referred to as soluble RAGE or sRAGE) are hypothesized to counteract the detrimental action of the full-length receptor and are hoped to provide a means to develop a cure against RAGE-associated diseases.

== Gene ==
The RAGE gene lies within the major histocompatibility complex (MHC class III region) on chromosome 6 and comprises 11 exons interlaced by 10 introns. Total length of the gene is about 1400 base pairs (bp) including the promoter region, which partly overlaps with the PBX2 gene. About 30 polymorphisms are known most of which are single-nucleotide polymorphisms.

== RNA and alternative splicing ==
The primary transcript of the human RAGE gene (pre-mRNA) is thought to be alternatively spliced. So far about 6 isoforms including the full length transmembrane receptor have been found in different tissues such as lung, kidney, brain etc. Five of these 6 isoforms lack the transmembrane domain and are thus believed to be secreted from cells. Generally these isoforms are referred to as sRAGE (soluble RAGE) or esRAGE (endogenous secretory RAGE). One of the isoforms lacks the V-domain and is thus believed not to be able to bind RAGE ligands.

== Structure ==
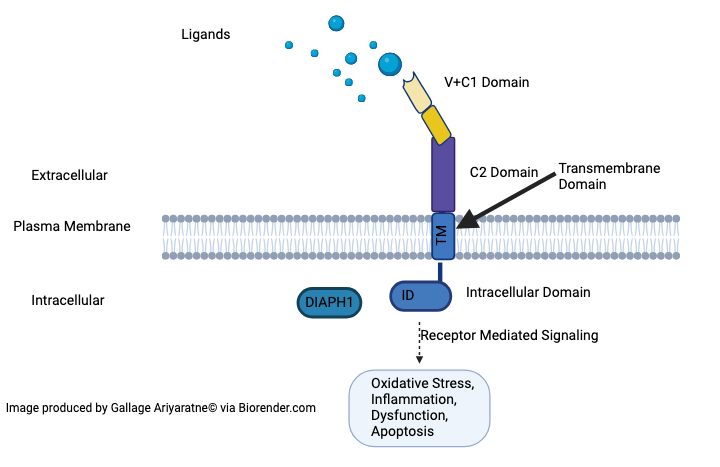
RAGE is a cell surface receptor consisting of three extracellular immunoglobulin-like domains—a V-type domain and two C-type domains—a transmembrane domain (TM), and an intracellular domain (ID) essential for signaling. When RAGE is activated by its ligands, it recruits and binds to the intracellular formin protein DIAPH1, triggering pathological signaling pathways that can cause oxidative stress, inflammation, cellular dysfunction, and apoptosis.

RAGE exists in two primary forms in the body: a membrane-bound form known as mRAGE and a soluble form known as sRAGE. The membrane-bound form (mRAGE) consists of three key components: an extracellular region made up of three immunoglobulin-like domains (one variable V-type domain and two constant C-type domains), a transmembrane domain that anchors the receptor to the cell membrane, and an intracellular domain essential for signaling.

In contrast, the soluble form (sRAGE) consists only of the extracellular domains and lacks both the transmembrane and intracellular domains. sRAGE can be produced by two different mechanisms: either through alternative splicing of the RAGE gene, leading to a truncated form that lacks the transmembrane and cytosolic regions, or through proteolytic cleavage of mRAGE by specific enzymes such as ADAM10 or matrix metalloproteinases (MMPs).

Upon ligand binding, mRAGE recruits the intracellular protein DIAPH1 (Diaphanous-related formin-1), which is critical for initiating intracellular signaling. This signaling cascade can result in pathological outcomes, including oxidative stress, inflammation, cellular dysfunction, and apoptosis. (Refer to the schematics attached) These effects are particularly significant in the progression of several chronic diseases, such as diabetes, cardiovascular diseases, neurodegenerative disorders, and cancer.

The full RAGE receptor plays an important role in cellular communication, interacting with a diverse set of ligands, including advanced glycation end products (AGEs), amyloid-β peptides, and S100 proteins. These interactions activate multiple downstream signaling pathways that contribute to cellular stress responses and are linked to the development of various inflammatory and metabolic conditions.

=== Membrane-bound (mRAGE) ===
The membrane-bound form of RAGE, commonly known as mRAGE, is a full-length receptor comprising several important structural domains:

1. Extracellular Domain: The extracellular domain is composed of multiple immunoglobulin-like subdomains, including the variable (V) domain and two constant domains (C1 and C2). The V domain serves as the principal binding site for a wide range of ligands, such as advanced glycation end-products (AGEs), S100 proteins, and high mobility group box 1 (HMGB1). This ligand-binding feature is essential for triggering downstream signaling cascades that lead to inflammatory responses.
2. Transmembrane Domain: The transmembrane domain helps anchor RAGE in the cellular membrane, ensuring that the receptor remains available to interact with extracellular ligands and transmit signals into the cell.
3. Cytoplasmic Domain: The cytoplasmic domain, also referred to as the cytosolic domain, is integral for intracellular signal transduction. When ligands bind to the extracellular domain, this segment interacts with intracellular signaling proteins, initiating processes such as the activation of NF-κB, a key inflammatory pathway. It has been observed that the absence of the cytoplasmic domain impairs the receptor's ability to transmit signals effectively, which underlines its importance in RAGE-mediated signaling.

=== Soluble (sRAGE) ===
The soluble form of RAGE (sRAGE) only includes the extracellular domain and lacks both the transmembrane and cytoplasmic domains. sRAGE can be generated through two primary mechanisms:

1. Alternative Splicing: In this mechanism, alternative splicing of the RAGE gene produces a variant that lacks the membrane-anchoring and cytoplasmic segments, creating a soluble form of the receptor
2. Proteolytic Cleavage: Alternatively, sRAGE can be produced by proteolytic cleavage of the membrane-bound receptor. This involves enzymes, such as matrix metalloproteinases (MMPs) and ADAM10, cleaving the extracellular portion of mRAGE, which is then released into the circulation.

== Function ==
- Membrane-Bound RAGE (mRAGE): mRAGE acts as a cellular receptor capable of activating inflammatory and oxidative stress pathways in response to ligand binding. The receptor's structure, which includes the ligand-binding domain, transmembrane segment, and cytoplasmic tail, is critical for these functions. The wide variety of ligands that interact with mRAGE contributes to its involvement in multiple pathological states, such as diabetes, neurodegeneration, and cardiovascular diseases.
- Soluble RAGE (sRAGE): On the other hand, sRAGE functions as a decoy receptor. It circulates in the bloodstream and binds RAGE ligands, thereby preventing them from activating mRAGE on the cell surface. By neutralizing these ligands, sRAGE reduces RAGE-mediated cellular activation and inflammation. Elevated levels of sRAGE are considered to have a protective effect in inflammatory diseases by limiting the activity of harmful ligands.

The balance between mRAGE and sRAGE levels is thought to influence disease outcomes. An excess of mRAGE is often associated with inflammation and disease progression, whereas higher concentrations of sRAGE may be beneficial in mitigating inflammatory responses.

== Ligands ==
RAGE is able to bind several ligands and therefore is referred to as a pattern-recognition receptor. Ligands which have so far been found to bind RAGE are:

- AGE
- HMGB1 (Amphoterin)
- S100A12 (EN-RAGE)
- S100B
- S100A7 (psoriasin) but not highly homologous S100A7A (koebnerisin)
- S100P
- S100A8/A9 complex referred to as calprotectin
- Amyloid-β-protein
- Mac-1
- Phosphatidylserine.
- S100A4

=== Binding mechanism ===
The receptor for advanced glycation end products (RAGE) is a multiligand member of the immunoglobulin superfamily, originally identified due to its ability to bind advanced glycation end products (AGEs). AGEs accumulate in various chronic conditions such as diabetes and renal failure. However, RAGE also binds other ligands, notably proteins of the S100/calgranulin family, such as EN-RAGE and S100B, which play significant roles in inflammatory processes.

RAGE ligands interact with the receptor through its extracellular domain, triggering a cascade of intracellular signaling pathways. These pathways lead to the activation of key transcription factors like nuclear factor kappa B (NF-κB), which is central to the expression of proinflammatory cytokines, adhesion molecules (such as VCAM-1 and ICAM-1), and other mediators of inflammation. Upon binding ligands like EN-RAGE or S100B, RAGE stimulates various inflammatory responses, including endothelial cell activation, mononuclear cell migration, and the production of cytokines such as TNF-α and IL-1β.

These interactions between RAGE and its ligands contribute to chronic inflammatory conditions, including atherosclerosis, Alzheimer's disease, and diabetic complications. Inhibiting the RAGE-ligand interaction—through the use of soluble RAGE (sRAGE) or specific antibodies—can suppress these inflammatory responses, offering potential therapeutic strategies.

== Other receptors ==
Besides RAGE there are other receptors which are believed to bind advanced glycation endproducts. However, these receptors could play a role in the removal of AGE rather than in signal transduction as is the case for RAGE. Other AGE receptors are:

- SR-A (Macrophage scavenger receptor Type I and II) : The macrophage scavenger receptor types I and II help clear modified proteins, including AGEs. This process is essential for macrophage-mediated removal of potentially harmful AGEs from circulation, reducing oxidative stress and inflammation.
- OST-48 (Oligosaccharyl transferase-4) (AGE-R1): Also known as AGE-R1, OST-48 has been implicated in AGE detoxification, helping to prevent AGE accumulation, particularly in diabetic complications. AGE-R1 expression has been correlated with decreased AGE-induced cellular toxicity, making it a potential protective factor in AGE-related pathologies.
- 80 K-H phosphoprotein (Proteinkinase C substrate) (AGE-R2):The 80 K-H phosphoprotein, also known as protein kinase C substrate, is thought to be involved in the signaling response to AGE exposure. AGE-R2 helps regulate intracellular pathways that may contribute to the cell's response to oxidative stress.
- Galectin-3 (AGE-R3):Galectin-3 is a lectin that binds AGEs and facilitates their removal from the extracellular space. It plays a role in modulating processes such as apoptosis, cell growth, and immune response, which helps in reducing AGE-induced tissue damage.
- LOX-1 (Lectin-like oxidized low density lipoprotein receptor-1):LOX-1 is known for its role in binding oxidized lipoproteins but also binds AGEs. It is involved in endothelial dysfunction and atherosclerotic plaque formation, suggesting that AGE binding by LOX-1 can exacerbate vascular complications, particularly in metabolic disorders.
- CD36:The CD36 receptor is another important receptor for AGEs, primarily involved in facilitating the uptake and clearance of AGE-modified proteins. It plays a role in inflammation and oxidative stress, with expression on cells like macrophages, endothelial cells, and adipocytes. CD36 involvement in AGE recognition contributes to lipid metabolism and immune response regulation.
- SR-BI (Scavenger Receptor Class B Type I):SR-BI is primarily known for mediating cholesterol transport, but it has also been implicated in the recognition and binding of AGEs. It plays a role in lipid metabolism and contributes to the cellular uptake of AGE-modified proteins, thus helping in AGE clearance and reducing potential cellular stress.
- LRP1 (Low-Density Lipoprotein Receptor-Related Protein 1):LRP1 is involved in the endocytosis of various ligands, including AGEs. LRP1 functions by promoting cellular uptake and degradation of AGE-modified proteins, helping to protect against oxidative damage and inflammation that arise from AGE accumulation. LRP1 is found in a variety of tissues, including the liver and vascular smooth muscle cells.
- MSR1 (Macrophage Scavenger Receptor 1):The macrophage scavenger receptor 1 (MSR1) is an important receptor in the immune system, involved in the phagocytic uptake of AGEs. It helps macrophages recognize and degrade modified proteins, contributing to the reduction of inflammation and cellular stress in the tissues exposed to AGEs.
- FEEL-1/CLEC14A (Facultative Endothelial Lectin-1): FEEL-1, also known as CLEC14A, is a member of the C-type lectin receptor family. It has been found to interact with AGEs and participate in their clearance. This receptor is primarily expressed on endothelial cells and plays a role in maintaining vascular health by reducing the burden of AGE-modified proteins.
- SR-BII (Scavenger Receptor Class B Type II):SR-BII is similar to SR-BI but has distinct functions. It binds AGEs and has been implicated in mediating the uptake of modified proteins. SR-BII is involved in lipid transfer processes and, like SR-BI, may contribute to mitigating AGE-induced cellular stress.
- DC-SIGN (Dendritic Cell-Specific Intercellular adhesion molecule-3-Grabbing Non-integrin): DC-SIGN is a receptor expressed on dendritic cells that plays a key role in pathogen recognition and immune response. Emerging research suggests that DC-SIGN can bind AGEs and mediate their clearance, reducing AGE-induced immune activation.

=== Clearance and signal transduction ===
- 1. SR-A (Macrophage Scavenger Receptor Type I and II):: SR-A, also known as macrophage scavenger receptor Type I and II, is primarily expressed on macrophages. These receptors play an important role in recognizing and clearing modified proteins such as AGEs from circulation. The binding of AGEs to SR-A triggers internalization and degradation, effectively reducing oxidative stress within tissues. Upon ligand binding, SR-A activates downstream signaling pathways that promote phagocytosis and lysosomal degradation. This receptor also plays a role in modulating inflammatory signaling pathways, thereby contributing to the regulation of tissue homeostasis and preventing chronic inflammation caused by AGE accumulation.
- OST-48 (Oligosaccharyl Transferase-4) (AGE-R1):OST-48, commonly referred to as AGE-R1, is involved in detoxifying and preventing the accumulation of AGEs, especially under conditions such as diabetes. The expression of OST-48 is regulated by cellular stress responses, particularly oxidative stress, which often coincides with elevated AGE levels. OST-48 contributes to reducing AGE-induced cellular toxicity by facilitating the breakdown of AGEs into less harmful by-products. The receptor interacts with various signaling molecules, such as peroxisome proliferator-activated receptor gamma (PPAR-γ), which assists in mitigating cellular stress responses and restoring metabolic balance. This detoxification process plays a crucial role in limiting the negative impacts of AGEs on vascular and metabolic health.
- 80 K-H Phosphoprotein (Protein Kinase C Substrate) (AGE-R2): The 80 K-H phosphoprotein, also known as protein kinase C substrate (AGE-R2), is involved in the intracellular signaling response to AGE exposure. AGE-R2 plays a role in regulating pathways that help cells adapt to oxidative stress by modulating protein kinase C (PKC) activity. This regulation aids in maintaining cellular homeostasis and mitigating the harmful effects of AGEs on cellular structures, ultimately contributing to the cell's resilience against oxidative stress.
- Galectin-3 (AGE-R3): Galectin-3, a member of the lectin family, is a multifunctional receptor that binds to AGEs and helps clear them from the extracellular space. This receptor is known for its involvement in modulating apoptosis, cell proliferation, and immune responses. Upon binding AGEs, Galectin-3 activates downstream signaling pathways, including those involving mitogen-activated protein kinases (MAPKs) and nuclear factor kappa B (NF-κB), which are crucial for inflammatory regulation. By mediating these pathways, Galectin-3 reduces the pro-inflammatory effects of AGE accumulation and helps maintain tissue integrity. Its role in regulating apoptosis and immune cell recruitment further contributes to limiting AGE-induced tissue damage, thus playing a protective role in chronic inflammatory and fibrotic conditions.
- LOX-1 (Lectin-like Oxidized Low-Density Lipoprotein Receptor-1): LOX-1 is primarily known for binding oxidized low-density lipoproteins (oxLDL) but also binds AGEs. It is expressed on endothelial cells, smooth muscle cells, and macrophages, and plays a key role in mediating endothelial dysfunction and promoting atherosclerotic plaque formation. The binding of AGEs to LOX-1 activates signaling pathways, including reactive oxygen species (ROS) production and NF-κB activation, which contribute to vascular inflammation and dysfunction. This makes LOX-1 a significant mediator in the progression of vascular complications, particularly in metabolic disorders like diabetes.
- CD36: CD36 is an important scavenger receptor expressed on macrophages, endothelial cells, and adipocytes, and it plays a major role in the recognition and uptake of AGE-modified proteins. CD36 facilitates the clearance of AGEs, thereby reducing oxidative stress and inflammation. It also contributes to lipid metabolism and immune regulation. The receptor is involved in activating signaling pathways such as MAPK and Toll-like receptor 4 (TLR4), which help modulate the inflammatory response to AGEs, thus preventing chronic inflammation and tissue damage.
- SR-BI (Scavenger Receptor Class B Type I): SR-BI is primarily known for its role in cholesterol transport but also binds AGEs. It is expressed on various cell types, including liver cells and endothelial cells, where it facilitates the uptake of AGE-modified proteins. By mediating the clearance of AGEs, SR-BI helps mitigate oxidative stress and maintain lipid homeostasis. Its role in lipid metabolism also supports the reduction of AGE-induced cellular damage, contributing to overall vascular health.
- LRP1 (Low-Density Lipoprotein Receptor-Related Protein 1): LRP1 is involved in the endocytosis and degradation of various ligands, including AGEs. It is expressed in tissues such as the liver, vascular smooth muscle cells, and neurons. LRP1 functions by promoting the cellular uptake of AGE-modified proteins, thereby preventing their accumulation and reducing oxidative damage. The receptor also interacts with signaling pathways that regulate inflammation, making it an important factor in protecting against AGE-induced vascular and metabolic complications.
- MSR1 (Macrophage Scavenger Receptor 1): MSR1, also known as class A scavenger receptor, is expressed primarily on macrophages and plays a crucial role in the phagocytic uptake of AGEs. By recognizing and internalizing AGE-modified proteins, MSR1 helps reduce inflammation and cellular stress in tissues exposed to AGEs. This receptor is involved in activating pro-inflammatory signaling pathways, but it also contributes to tissue repair and the resolution of inflammation, helping maintain tissue homeostasis.
- FEEL-1/CLEC14A (Facultative Endothelial Lectin-1): FEEL-1, also known as CLEC14A, is a C-type lectin receptor expressed on endothelial cells. It binds AGEs and facilitates their clearance, thereby helping to maintain vascular health. The interaction of FEEL-1 with AGEs is thought to reduce endothelial cell activation and inflammation, contributing to the protection of blood vessels from AGE-induced damage and maintaining vascular integrity.
- SR-BII (Scavenger Receptor Class B Type II): SR-BII, similar to SR-BI, is involved in lipid transfer and also binds AGEs. It plays a role in mediating the uptake of AGE-modified proteins and helps reduce cellular stress caused by AGEs. By participating in lipid metabolism and AGE clearance, SR-BII contributes to mitigating oxidative damage and supporting cellular homeostasis.
- DC-SIGN (Dendritic Cell-Specific Intercellular Adhesion Molecule-3-Grabbing Non-integrin): DC-SIGN is a receptor expressed on dendritic cells and is primarily involved in pathogen recognition and immune responses. Recent research suggests that DC-SIGN can also bind AGEs and mediate their clearance, which helps reduce AGE-induced immune activation. By modulating the immune response to AGEs, DC-SIGN plays a role in maintaining immune homeostasis and preventing chronic inflammation associated with AGE accumulation.

== Clinical significance ==
RAGE has been linked to several chronic diseases, which are thought to result from vascular damage. The pathogenesis is hypothesized to include ligand binding, upon which RAGE signals activation of nuclear factor kappa B (NF-κB). NF-κB controls several genes involved in inflammation. RAGE itself is upregulated by NF-κB. Given a condition in which there is a large amount of a RAGE ligand present (e.g. AGE in diabetes or amyloid-β-protein in Alzheimer's disease) this establishes a positive feed-back cycle, which leads to chronic inflammation. This chronic condition is then believed to alter the micro- and macrovasculature, resulting in organ damage or even organ failure. However, whilst RAGE is up-regulated in inflammatory conditions, it is down-regulated in lung cancer and pulmonary fibrosis.

Diseases that have been linked to RAGE include:

- Alzheimer's disease
- Arthritis
- Atherosclerosis
- Congenital diaphragmatic hernia
- Congestive heart failure
- Diabetes
- Myocardial infarction
- Peripheral vascular disease
- Psoriasis
- Rheumatoid arthritis
- Schizophrenia
- Takayasu's arteritis

=== Lungs ===
RAGE is expressed at its highest levels in the lung compared to other tissues, especially in alveolar type I cells. In cases of idiopathic pulmonary fibrosis (IPF), RAGE expression is lost, indicating that its regulation and expression in the pulmonary system differ from that in the vascular system. Studies show that blocking or knocking down RAGE impairs cell adhesion and increases cell proliferation and migration.

=== Diabetes ===
RAGE plays a pivotal role in the pathogenesis of diabetes. RAGE, a multi-ligand receptor from the immunoglobulin superfamily, primarily binds to Advanced glycation end-products (AGEs) formed through the non-enzymatic glycation of proteins and lipids. In diabetes, hyperglycemia accelerates AGE formation, fostering a pro-inflammatory and pro-oxidative environment that worsens vascular damage and immune cell dysfunction.

In both type 1 and type 2 diabetes, RAGE significantly contributes to microvascular and macrovascular complications. It is highly expressed in diabetic blood vessels, cardiomyocytes, podocytes, and immune cells, where it co-localizes with ligands such as AGEs, S100 proteins, and high-mobility group box 1 (HMGB1). This co-localization leads to chronic cellular stress and inflammation, which differs from the transient inflammatory responses associated with acute infections.

RAGE activation contributes to complications such as diabetic nephropathy and retinopathy. Studies in diabetic mouse models suggest that blocking RAGE with soluble receptor forms (sRAGE) can mitigate these conditions by reducing mesangial sclerosis, basement membrane thickening, and endothelial damage. Additionally, RAGE's interaction with AGEs and S100 proteins accelerates atherosclerosis in diabetes, marked by increased lesion complexity, macrophage accumulation, and vascular inflammation.

=== Cardiovascular disease ===
Beyond diabetes, RAGE is crucial in cardiovascular disease pathogenesis, particularly atherosclerosis. Although RAGE is present in atherosclerotic plaques in both diabetic and non-diabetic patients, its expression is heightened in diabetic individuals. RAGE activation in smooth muscle cells, endothelial cells, and macrophages promotes atherosclerotic lesion development through mechanisms involving oxidative stress, inflammatory signaling, and immune cell recruitment.

RAGE-mediated signaling exacerbates vascular inflammation, endothelial dysfunction, and plaque instability. Animal studies demonstrate that blocking RAGE in diabetic models can reduce lesion formation and improve vascular function, even without affecting blood glucose levels.

=== Therapeutic insights ===
The distinct structure of RAGE makes it a potential target for therapeutic intervention, particularly in conditions involving chronic inflammation. Inhibitors that prevent ligand binding to the V domain have been studied to reduce downstream inflammatory signaling. Targeting the cytoplasmic domain to disrupt intracellular signal transduction is another approach being explored. Additionally, increasing the levels of sRAGE could serve as an effective strategy to neutralize pro-inflammatory ligands and limit their interaction with mRAGE, offering potential benefits in treating inflammatory conditions.

=== As a drug target ===
Given its prominent role in both diabetes and CVD, RAGE is a promising therapeutic target. Preclinical and clinical studies are exploring RAGE antagonism to treat these conditions. Blocking RAGE signaling, either through pharmacological inhibitors or soluble decoy receptors like sRAGE, has shown potential in reducing vascular complications in diabetic patients. These strategies may offer new ways to manage the chronic inflammation and oxidative stress that drive both diabetic complications and cardiovascular disease progression

RAGE's role in diabetes and cardiovascular disease highlights the importance of its signaling pathway in mediating chronic inflammation and vascular damage. Targeting RAGE could offer a promising approach to mitigating the burden of these diseases, particularly in patients with diabetes, where current therapies may fall short in preventing cardiovascular complications.

== Inhibitors ==
A number of small molecule RAGE inhibitors or antagonists have been reported.

Azeliragon
vTv Therapeutics (formerly TransTech Pharma) sponsored a Phase 3 clinical trial of their RAGE inhibitor Azeliragon (TTP488) for mild Alzheimer's disease. These trials were halted in 2018.
RAP (Receptor Antagonist Peptide)
RAP is a peptide-based inhibitor that functions by directly competing with RAGE ligands for binding, thereby inhibiting RAGE-mediated signaling. It has shown potential in reducing vascular inflammation and preventing atherosclerosis in experimental models. RAP's ability to block the RAGE-ligand interaction has made it a candidate for cardiovascular disease therapies, particularly those involving chronic inflammation.
FPS-ZM1
FPS-ZM1 is a well-known small molecule inhibitor of RAGE, designed to cross the blood-brain barrier and effectively block RAGE signaling in the central nervous system. Studies have demonstrated that FPS-ZM1 significantly reduces neuroinflammation and β-amyloid accumulation in mouse models of Alzheimer's disease. By inhibiting RAGE, FPS-ZM1 aims to reduce oxidative stress and inflammation associated with neurodegenerative processes, showing promise in preclinical studies for treating Alzheimer's disease and other neuroinflammatory conditions.

== Research ==
=== Extracellular vesicle cross-talk ===
Recent studies have highlighted the involvement of RAGE (Receptor for Advanced Glycation End-products) in mediating the intercellular communication through extracellular vesicles (EVs), particularly during inflammatory responses. RAGE, known for its interaction with various ligands including advanced glycation end-products (AGEs), plays a key role in the biogenesis and secretion of EVs from stressed or damaged cells. Extracellular vesicles, such as exosomes, are small lipid-bound vesicles that facilitate cell-to-cell communication by transferring molecular cargo including proteins, lipids, and RNAs between cells. Recent evidence suggests that RAGE-associated vesicular pathways contribute to the exacerbation of inflammation by enabling pro-inflammatory signaling between cells.

Specifically, a study from 2023 demonstrated that β-cells exposed to cytokine-induced stress release EVs enriched with RAGE ligands, which were found to further activate RAGE signaling pathways in neighboring cells, promoting inflammatory responses and impairing insulin secretion. These EV-mediated effects were shown to propagate inflammation across multiple cell types, indicating that RAGE-associated vesicles may play a pivotal role in amplifying the immune response in metabolic disorders like diabetes. Another study from 2024 reported that EVs containing RAGE ligands could be detected in the bloodstream of patients with early-stage diabetes, suggesting the potential utility of these vesicles as biomarkers for early diagnosis of inflammatory diseases.

Furthermore, these findings emphasize the dual role of RAGE in both EV biogenesis and as a mediator of inflammation through vesicular cross-talk, which has implications for targeting RAGE-EV interactions in therapeutic strategies aimed at mitigating inflammatory diseases.

=== Role in aging ===
The relationship between RAGE signaling and aging has been a growing focus of research, particularly in the context of cellular senescence and inflammaging—chronic, low-grade inflammation associated with aging. RAGE has been implicated in promoting cellular senescence, a permanent state of cell-cycle arrest, which contributes to the accumulation of dysfunctional cells that secrete pro-inflammatory factors, collectively referred to as the senescence-associated secretory phenotype (SASP).

A study conducted in 2022 demonstrated that the activation of RAGE by AGEs in aged tissues leads to the accumulation of senescent cells, thereby exacerbating tissue inflammation and contributing to age-related diseases. This study also noted that the upregulation of RAGE in aged cells increased the secretion of SASP factors, such as interleukin-6 (IL-6) and tumor necrosis factor-alpha (TNF-α), both of which are key mediators of inflammaging.

Another recent investigation from 2023 found that mice deficient in RAGE exhibited reduced markers of senescence and systemic inflammation compared to age-matched controls, suggesting that targeting RAGE signaling may be a promising approach to mitigate the adverse effects of aging and extend healthspan. These findings highlight the role of RAGE as a crucial regulator of the inflammatory milieu associated with aging, providing potential avenues for therapeutic interventions aimed at reducing age-related inflammatory diseases.
