= Basigin =

Mammalian protein found in Homo sapiens

BSG
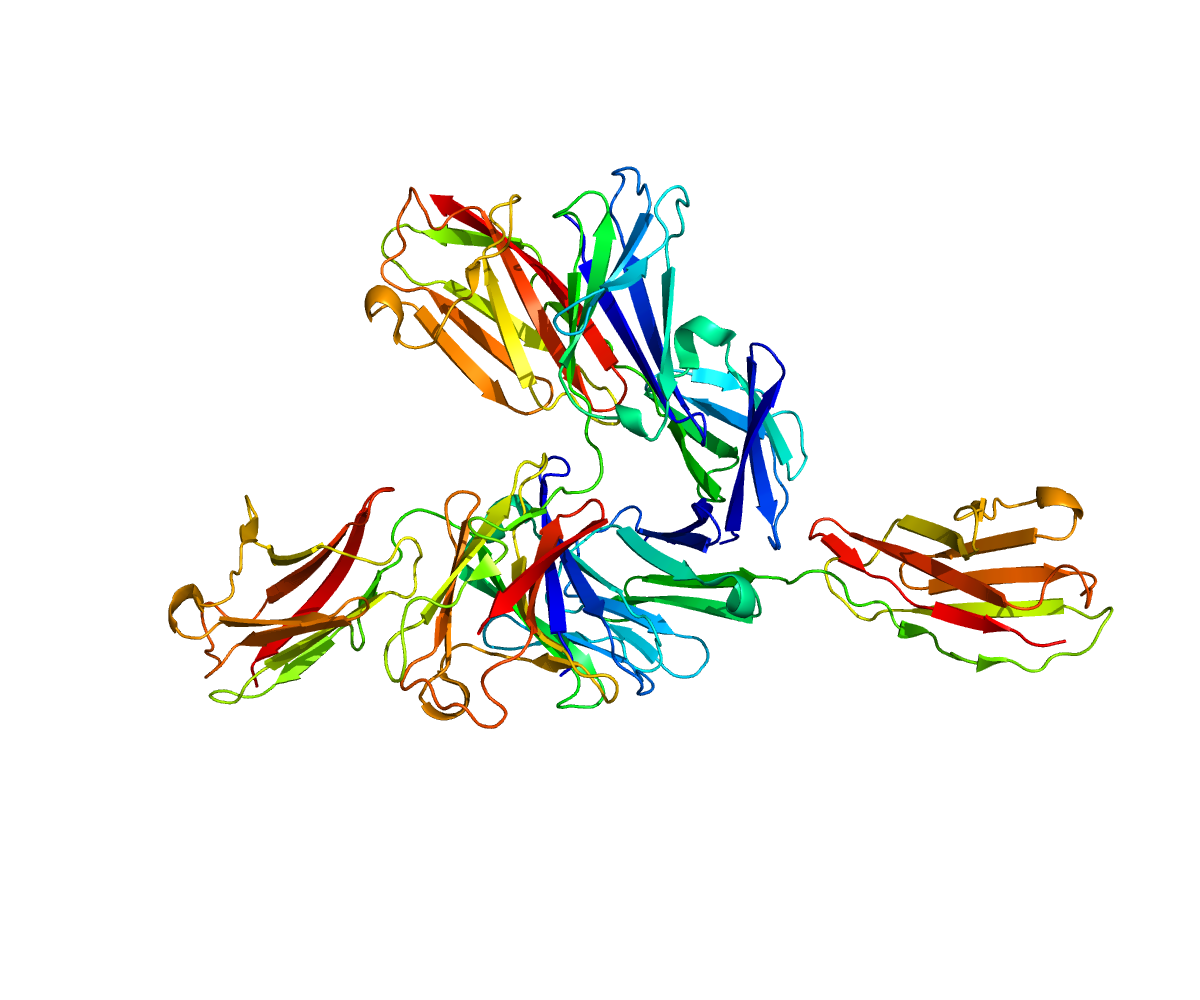

Identifiers
- Aliases: BSG, 5F7, CD147, EMMPRIN, M6, OK, TCSF, basigin (Ok blood group), EMPRIN, SLC7A11, HAb18G
- External IDs: OMIM: 109480; MGI: 88208; GeneCards: BSG
Available structures
PDB	Ortholog search: A0A087X2B5 PDBe A0A087X2B5 RCSB
PDB	List of PDB id codes 4U0Q, 3B5H, 3I84, 3I85, 3QQN, 3QR2

Gene location (Human)
Chr.	Chromosome 19 (human)
Band	19p13.3	Start	571,277 bp
Band	19p13.3	End	583,494 bp

Gene location (Mouse)
Chr.	Chromosome 10 (mouse)
Band	10 C1|10 39.72 cM	Start	79,540,325 bp
Band	10 C1|10 39.72 cM	End	79,547,803 bp
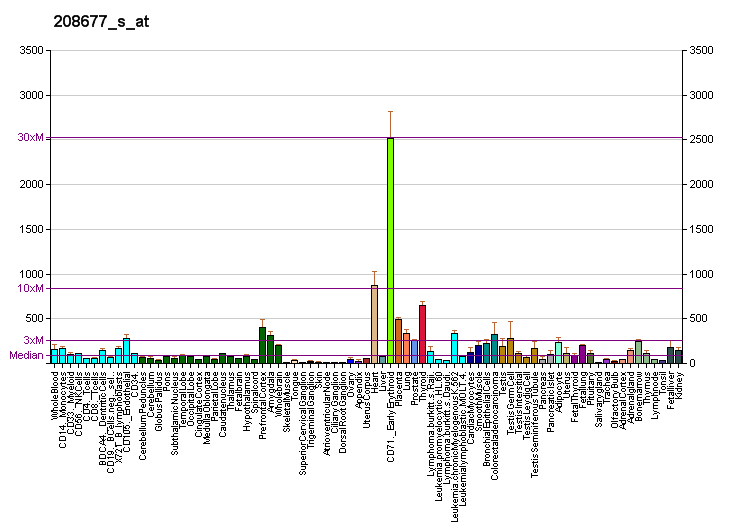
RNA expression pattern
Bgee	Human / Mouse (ortholog); Top expressed in: apex of heart; right testis; left testis; mucosa of transverse colon; right auricle of heart; left ventricle; right frontal lobe; stromal cell of endometrium; right adrenal cortex; left adrenal gland / Top expressed in: choroid plexus of fourth ventricle; molar; interventricular septum; myocardium of ventricle; left lung lobe; cardiac muscle tissue of left ventricle; right ventricle; tail of embryo; spermatocyte; muscle of thigh; More reference expression data
BioGPS	More reference expression data
Gene ontology
Molecular function	protein binding; mannose binding; carbohydrate binding; monocarboxylic acid transmembrane transporter activity; cadherin binding; cell-cell adhesion mediator activity
Cellular component	integral component of membrane; membrane; focal adhesion; melanosome; Golgi membrane; plasma membrane; integral component of plasma membrane; acrosomal membrane; mitochondrion; membrane raft; sarcolemma; extracellular exosome; intracellular membrane-bounded organelle; axon
Biological process	response to peptide hormone; extracellular matrix disassembly; extracellular matrix organization; odontogenesis of dentin-containing tooth; cell surface receptor signaling pathway; decidualization; pyruvate metabolic process; response to mercury ion; response to cAMP; embryo implantation; leukocyte migration; monocarboxylic acid transport; protein localization to plasma membrane; homophilic cell adhesion via plasma membrane adhesion molecules; axon guidance; dendrite self-avoidance
Sources:Amigo / QuickGO
Orthologs
Databases	NCBI: entry; OMA: entry
Species	Human	Mouse
Entrez	682	12215
Ensembl	ENSG00000172270	ENSMUSG00000023175
UniProt	P35613	P18572
RefSeq (mRNA)	NM_001728; NM_198589; NM_198590; NM_198591; NM_001322243	NM_001077184; NM_009768
RefSeq (protein)	NP_001309172; NP_001719; NP_940991; NP_940992; NP_940993	NP_001070652; NP_033898
Location (UCSC)	Chr 19: 0.57 – 0.58 Mb	Chr 10: 79.54 – 79.55 Mb
PubMed search
- Wikidata
View/Edit Human	View/Edit Mouse

Basigin (BSG) also known as extracellular matrix metalloproteinase inducer (EMMPRIN) or cluster of differentiation 147 (CD147) is a protein that in humans is encoded by the BSG gene. This protein is a determinant for the Ok blood group system. There are three known antigens in the Ok system; the most common being Ok^{a} (also called OK1), OK2 and OK3. Basigin has been shown to be an essential receptor on red blood cells for the human malaria parasite, Plasmodium falciparum. The common isoform of basigin (basigin-2) has two immunoglobulin domains, and the extended form basigin-1 has three.

== Function ==
Basigin is a member of the immunoglobulin superfamily, with a structure related to the putative primordial form of the family. As members of the immunoglobulin superfamily play fundamental roles in intercellular recognition involved in various immunologic phenomena, differentiation, and development, basigin is thought also to play a role in intercellular recognition.

It has a variety of functions. In addition to its metalloproteinase-inducing ability, basigin also regulates several distinct functions, such as spermatogenesis, expression of the monocarboxylate transporter and the responsiveness of lymphocytes. Basigin is a type I integral membrane receptor that has many ligands, including the cyclophilin (CyP) proteins Cyp-A and CyP-B and certain integrins. Basigin also serves as a receptor for S100A9 and platelet glycoprotein VI, and basigin-1 acts as a receptor for the rod-derived cone viability factor. It is expressed by many cell types, including epithelial cells, endothelial cells, neural progenitor cells and leukocytes. The human basigin protein contains 269 amino acids that form two heavily glycosylated C2 type immunoglobulin-like domains at the N-terminal extracellular portion. A second form of basigin has also been characterized that contains one additional immunoglobulin-like domain in its extracellular portion.

== Interactions ==
Basigin has been shown to interact with Ubiquitin C.

Basigin has been shown to form a complex with monocarboxylate transporters in the retina of mice. Basigin appears to be required for proper placement of MCTs in the membrane. In the Basigin null mouse, the failure of MCTs to integrate with the membrane may be directly linked to a failure of nutrient transfer in the retinal pigmented epithelium (the lactates transported by MCTs 1, 3, and 4 are essential nutrients for the developing retinal pigment epithelium), resulting in loss of sight in the null animal.

Basigin interacts with the fourth C-type lectin domain in the receptor Endo180 to form a molecular epithelial-mesenchymal transition suppressor complex that if disrupted results in the induction of invasive prostate epithelial cell behavior associated with poor prostate cancer survival.

== Modulators ==
It have been shown that atorvastatin suppresses CD147 and MMP-3 expression.

== Role in malaria ==
It has recently (November 2011) been found that basigin is a receptor that is essential to erythrocyte invasion by most strains of Plasmodium falciparum, the most virulent species of the Plasmodium parasites that cause human malaria. It is hoped that by developing antibodies to the parasite ligand for Basigin, Rh5, a better vaccine for malaria might be found. Basigin is bound by the PfRh5 protein on the surface of the malaria parasite.

== Role in SARS-CoV-2 infection (COVID-19) ==
Meplazumab, an anti-CD147 antibody, was tested in patients with SARS-CoV-2 pneumonia.

Some of these claims have been challenged by another group of scientists who found no evidence of a direct role for basigin in either binding the viral spike protein or promoting lung cell infection.

More recent studies suggests CD147 as SARS-CoV-2 entry receptor of platelets and megakaryocytes, leading to hyperactivation and thrombosis, that differs from common cold coronavirus CoV-OC43. Incubation of megakaryocyte cells with SARS-CoV-2 resulted in a significant increase in the proinflammatory transcripts LGALS3BP and S100A9. Notably, CD147 antibody-mediated blocking significantly reduced the expression of S100A9, and S100A8 on megakaryocytes following incubation with SARS-CoV-2. These data indicate that megakaryocytes and platelets actively take up SARS-CoV-2 virions, likely via an ACE-2-independent mechanism.

Another study states that platelets challenged with SARS-CoV-2 undergo activation, dependent on the CD147 receptor. Yet SARS-CoV-2 does not replicate in human platelets, but initiates cell death.

Yet another study describes high-interaction coupling of N-RBD of SARS-CoV-2 and CD147 as the main way of infecting lymphocytes allegedly leading to Acquired Immune Deficiency Syndrome.
