= Fit testing =

Fit testing may refer to:

- Fecal immunochemical testing
- Hearing protection fit-testing
- Respirator fit test
