= Malas (Ayurveda) =

Malas (/məˈlɑːs/ mə-LAHS) in Ayurveda are the waste products of the body. The trimala (three malas) include urine, stool, and sweat. In Ayurveda, the excreta of the eyes, ears, nose, tears, nails, and hair are also categorised as mala. The effective elimination of malas is said to be important for maintaining good health. It is one of the pillars that contribute to the basic structure and functioning of the body.
