= C20H17F3N2O4 =

The molecular formula C_{20}H_{17}F_{3}N_{2}O_{4} (molar mass: 406.355 g/mol) may refer to:

- Floctafenine
- Tasquinimod
