= Human feces =

Metabolic waste of the human digestive system

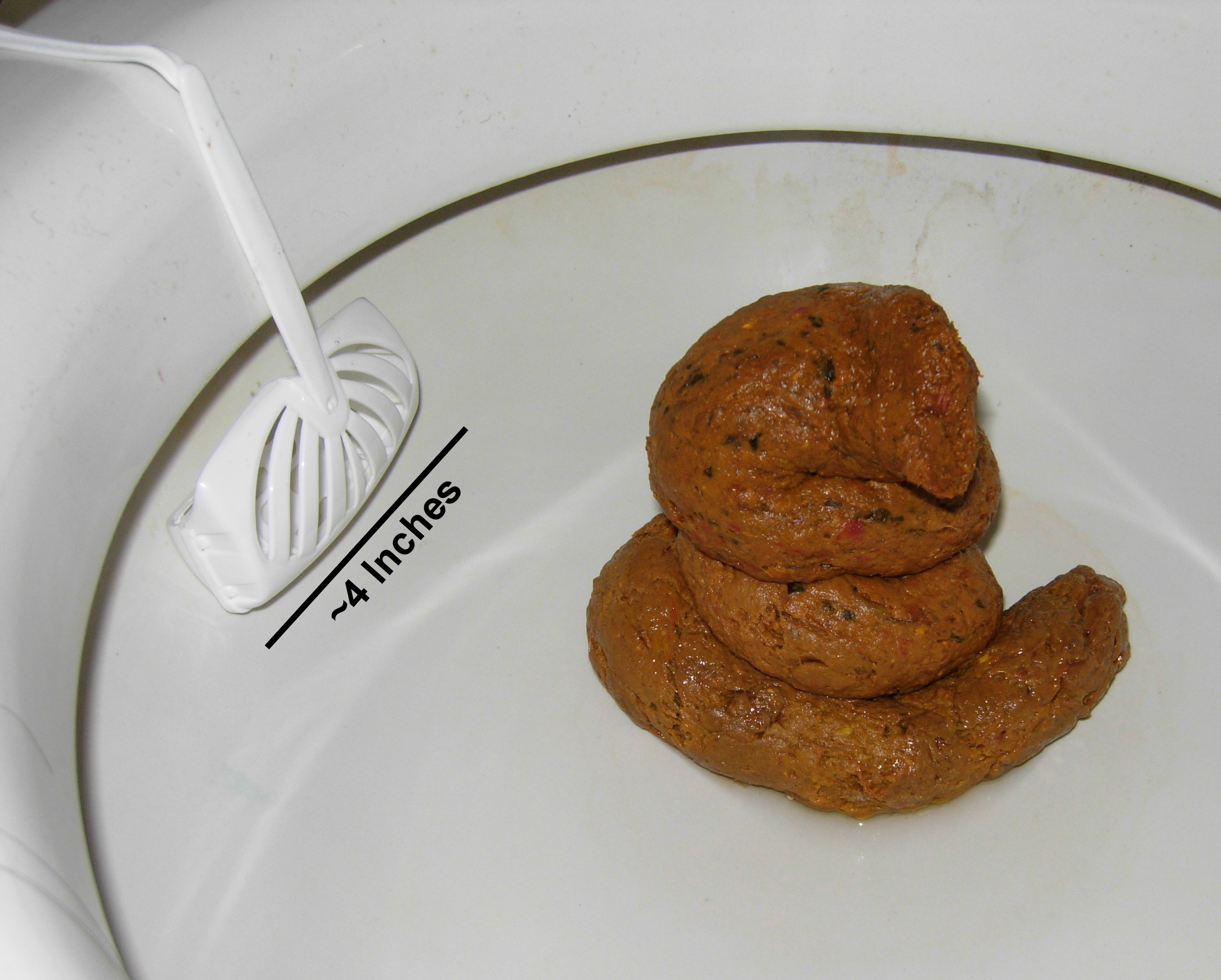
Human feces photographed in a toilet, shortly after defecation.

Human feces (American English) or faeces (British English), commonly and in medical literature more often called stool, commonly referred to as poo or poop, are the solid or semisolid remains of food that could not be digested or absorbed in the small intestine of humans, but has been further broken down by bacteria in the large intestine. It also contains bacteria and a relatively small amount of metabolic waste products such as bacterially altered bilirubin, and the dead epithelial cells from the lining of the gut. It is discharged through the anus during a process called defecation.

Human feces have similarities to the feces of other animals and varies significantly in appearance (i.e. size, color, texture), according to the state of the diet, digestive system, and general health. Normally, human feces are semisolid, with a mucus coating. Small pieces of harder, less moist feces can sometimes be seen impacted in the distal (final or lower) end. This is a normal occurrence when a prior bowel movement is incomplete, and feces are returned from the rectum to the large intestine, where water is further absorbed.

Human feces together with human urine are collectively called human waste or excretion. Containing human feces and preventing spread of pathogens from human feces by the fecal–oral route are the main goals of sanitation.

== Characteristics ==
=== Classification ===
The Bristol stool scale is a medical aid designed to classify the form of human feces into seven categories. Sometimes referred to in the UK as the Meyers Scale, it was developed by K.W. Heaton at the University of Bristol and was first published in the Scandinavian Journal of Gastroenterology in 1997. The form of the stool depends on the time it spends in the colon.

The seven types of stool are:

1. Separate hard lumps, like nuts (hard to pass)
2. Sausage-shaped but lumpy
3. Like a sausage but with cracks on the surface
4. Like a sausage or snake, smooth and soft
5. Soft blobs with clear-cut edges
6. Fluffy pieces with ragged edges, a mushy stool
7. Watery, no solid pieces. Entirely liquid

Types 1 and 2 indicate constipation. Types 3 and 4 are optimal, especially the latter, as these are the easiest to pass. Types 5–7 are associated with increasing tendency to diarrhea or urgency.

Meconium is a newborn infant's first feces.

=== Color ===
Human fecal matter varies significantly in appearance, depending on diet and health.

==== Brown ====
Human feces ordinarily has a light to dark brown coloration, which results from a combination of bile, and bilirubin derivatives of stercobilin and urobilin, from dead red blood cells. Normally it is semisolid, with a mucus coating.

==== Black or red ====
Feces can be black due to the presence of red blood cells that have been in the intestines long enough to be broken down by digestive enzymes. This is known as melena, and is typically due to bleeding in the upper digestive tract, such as from a bleeding peptic ulcer. Conditions that can also cause blood in the stool include hemorrhoids, anal fissures, diverticulitis, colon cancer, and ulcerative colitis. The same color change can be observed after consuming foods that contain a substantial proportion of animal blood, such as black pudding or tiết canh. Black feces can also be caused by a number of medications, such as bismuth subsalicylate, activated charcoal, and dietary iron supplements, or foods such as beetroot, black liquorice, or blueberries.

Hematochezia is similarly the passage of feces that is bright red due to the presence of undigested blood, either from lower in the digestive tract, or from a more active source in the upper digestive tract. Alcoholism can also provoke abnormalities in the path of blood throughout the body, including the passing of red-black stool. Hemorrhoids can also cause surface staining of red on stools, because as they leave the body the process can compress and burst hemorrhoids near the anus.

==== Orange ====
Stool may be orange due to excess β-carotene intake from vegetables including carrots.

==== Yellow ====
Yellowing of feces can be caused by an infection known as giardiasis, which derives its name from Giardia, an anaerobic flagellated protozoan parasite that can cause severe and communicable yellow diarrhea. Another cause of yellowing is a condition known as Gilbert's Syndrome. Yellow stool can also indicate that food is passing through the digestive tract relatively quickly. Yellow stool can be found in people with gastroesophageal reflux disease (GERD).

==== Green ====
Feces can be green due to having large amounts of unprocessed bile in the digestive tract and strong-smelling diarrhea. This can occasionally be the result from eating liquorice candy, as it is typically made with anise oil rather than liquorice herb and is predominantly sugar. Excessive sugar consumption or a sensitivity to anise oil may cause loose, green stools. It can also result from consuming excessive amounts of blue or green dye.

==== Blue ====
Prussian blue, or blue, a coloring used in the treatment of radiation, cesium, and thallium poisoning, can turn the feces blue. Substantial consumption of products containing blue food dye, such as blue curaçao or grape soda, can have the same effect.

==== Violet or purple ====
Violet or purple feces is a symptom of porphyria or more likely the consumption of beetroot.

==== Pale or gray ====
Stool that is pale or grey may be caused by insufficient bile output due to conditions such as cholecystitis, gallstones, giardia parasitic infection, hepatitis, chronic pancreatitis, or cirrhosis. Bile pigments from the liver give stool its brownish color. If there is decreased bile output, stool is much lighter in color.

==== Silver ====
A tarnished-silver or aluminium paint-like feces color characteristically results when biliary obstruction of any type (white stool) combines with gastrointestinal bleeding from any source (black stool). It can also suggest a carcinoma of the ampulla of Vater, which will result in gastrointestinal bleeding and biliary obstruction, resulting in silver stool.

=== Odor ===
Feces possesses physiological odor, which can vary according to diet and health status. For example, meat protein is rich in the amino acid methionine, which is a precursor of the sulfur-containing odorous compounds listed below. The odor of human feces is suggested to be made up from the following odorant volatiles:

- Methyl sulfides
  - methylmercaptan/methanethiol (MM)
  - dimethyl sulfide (DMS)
  - dimethyl disulfide (DMDS)
  - dimethyl trisulfide (DMTS)
- Benzopyrrole volatiles
  - indole
  - skatole
- Hydrogen sulfide (H_{2}S)

(H_{2}S) is the most common volatile sulfur compound in feces. The odor of feces may be increased when various pathologies are present, including:

- Celiac disease
- Crohn's disease
- Ulcerative colitis
- Chronic pancreatitis
- Cystic fibrosis
- Intestinal infection, e.g. Clostridium difficile infection.
- Malabsorption
- Short bowel syndrome

Attempts to reduce the odor of feces (and flatus) are largely based on animal research carried out with industrial applications, such as reduced environmental impact of pig farming. See also: Flatulence#Management, odor. Many dietary modifications/supplements have been researched, including:

- Activated charcoal (In this study it was found that activated charcoal at a dose of 0.52g four times a day did not appreciably influence the liberation of fecal gases.)
- Bismuth subsalicylate
- Chloryphyllyn
- Herbs such as rosemary
- Yucca schidigera
- Zinc acetate

=== Average chemical characteristics ===
On average, healthy humans eliminate 128 g of fresh feces per person per day with a pH value of around 6.6 as indicated by a Fecal pH test. Fresh feces contains around 75% water and the remaining solid fraction is 84–93% organic solids along with some insoluble phosphate salts.

These organic solids consist of: 25–54% bacterial biomass, 2–25% protein or nitrogenous matter, 25% carbohydrate or undigested plant matter, and 2–15% fat. Protein and fat come from the colon due to secretion, epithelial shedding, and gut bacterial action. These proportions vary considerably depending on many factors but mainly diet and body weight. The remaining solids are composed of insoluble calcium and iron phosphate salts, intestinal secretions, small amounts of dried epithelial cells, and mucus.

=== Undigested food remnants ===
Sometimes undigested food may make an appearance in feces. Common undigested foods found in human feces are seeds, nuts, and corn, mainly because of their high fiber content. Beets may turn feces different hues of red. Artificial food coloring in some processed foods, such as highly colorful packaged breakfast cereals, can cause an unusual coloring of feces if eaten in sufficient quantities.

Undigested objects such as seeds can pass through the human digestive system, and later germinate. One result of this is tomato plants growing where treated sewage sludge has been used as fertilizer.

== Analytical tools ==
=== Stool analysis (stool sample) ===
Clinical laboratory examination of feces, usually termed as stool examination or stool test, is conducted for the sake of diagnosis; for example, to detect the presence of parasites such as pinworms and their eggs (ova) or to detect disease-spreading bacteria. A stool culture—the controlled growth of microbial organisms in culture media under laboratory conditions—sometimes is performed to identify specific pathogens in stool. The stool guaiac test (or guaiac fecal occult blood test) is conducted to detect the presence of blood in stool that is not apparent to the unaided eye.

The main pathogens that are commonly looked for in feces include:

- Bacteroides species
- Salmonella and Shigella
- Yersinia tends to be incubated at 30 °C (86 °F), which is cooler than usual
- Campylobacter incubated at 42 °C (108 °F), in a special environment
- Aeromonas
- Candida if the person is immunosuppressed (e.g., undergoing cancer treatment)
- E. coli O157 if blood is visible in the stool sample
- Cryptosporidium
- Entamoeba histolytica

Intestinal parasites and their ova (eggs) can sometimes be visible to the naked eye.

=== Fecal markers ===
Feces can be analyzed for various markers that are indicative of various diseases and conditions. For example, fecal calprotectin levels indicate an inflammatory process such as Crohn's disease, ulcerative colitis, and neoplasms (cancer).

Reference ranges for fecal markers
Marker	Patient type	Upper limit	Unit
Calprotectin	2–9 years	166	μg/g of feces
Calprotectin	10–59 years	51	μg/g of feces
Calprotectin	≥ 60 years	112	μg/g of feces
Lactoferrin	2–9 years	29	μg/g of feces
Lactoferrin	≥ 10 years	4.6	μg/g of feces

Also, feces may be analyzed for any fecal occult blood, which is indicative of a gastrointestinal bleeding.

=== Analysis of E. coli bacteria in water sources ===
A quick test for fecal contamination of water sources or soil is a check for the presence of E. coli bacteria performed with the help of MacConkey agar plates or Petri dishes. E. coli bacteria uniquely develop red colonies at temperature of approximately 43 °C (109 °F) overnight. Although most strains of E. coli are harmless, their presence is indicative of fecal contamination, and hence an increased possibility of the presence of more dangerous organisms.

Fecal contamination of water sources is highly prevalent worldwide, accounting for the majority of unsafe drinking water. In developing countries most sewage is discharged without treatment. Even in developed countries events of sanitary sewer overflow are not uncommon and regularly pollute the Seine River (France) and the River Thames (England), for example.

== Diseases and conditions ==
=== Diarrhea ===
Diarrhea (or diarrhoea in British English) is the condition of having three or more loose or liquid bowel movements per day. This condition can be a symptom of injury, disease, or foodborne illness and is usually accompanied by abdominal pain. There are other conditions which involve some but not all of the symptoms of diarrhea, and so the formal medical definition of diarrhea involves defecation of more than 200 grams per day (though formal weighing of stools to determine a diagnosis is never actually carried out).

It occurs when insufficient fluid is absorbed by the colon. As part of the digestion process, or due to fluid intake, food is mixed with large amounts of water. Thus, digested food is essentially liquid prior to reaching the colon. The colon absorbs water, leaving the remaining material as a semisolid stool. If the colon is damaged or inflamed, however, absorption is inhibited, and watery stools result.

Diarrhea is most commonly caused by a myriad of viral infections but is also often the result of bacterial toxins and sometimes even infection. In sanitary living conditions and with ample food and water available, an otherwise healthy patient typically recovers from the common viral infections in a few days and at most a week. However, for ill or malnourished individuals diarrhea can lead to severe dehydration and can become life-threatening without treatment.

=== Constipation ===
Constipation refers to bowel movements that are infrequent or hard to pass. Constipation is a common cause of painful defecation. Severe constipation includes obstipation (failure to pass stools or gas) and fecal impaction, which can progress to bowel obstruction and become life-threatening.

=== Others ===
Bile overload is very rare, and not a health threat. Problems as simple as serious diarrhea may cause blood in one's stool. Black stools caused by the presence of blood usually indicate a problem in the intestines (the black color is a sign of digested blood), whereas red streaks of blood in stool usually are caused by bleeding in the rectum or anus.

== Uses ==
=== Use as fertilizer ===
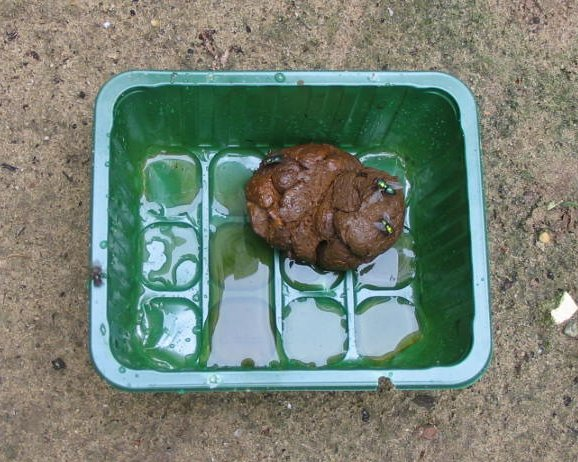
Fresh feces collected from a child for a drying experiment

Human feces has historically been used as fertilizer for centuries in the form of night soil, fecal sludge, and sewage sludge. The use of untreated human feces in agriculture poses significant health risks and has contributed to widespread infection with parasitic worms—a disease called helminthiasis, affecting over 1.5 billion people in developing countries.

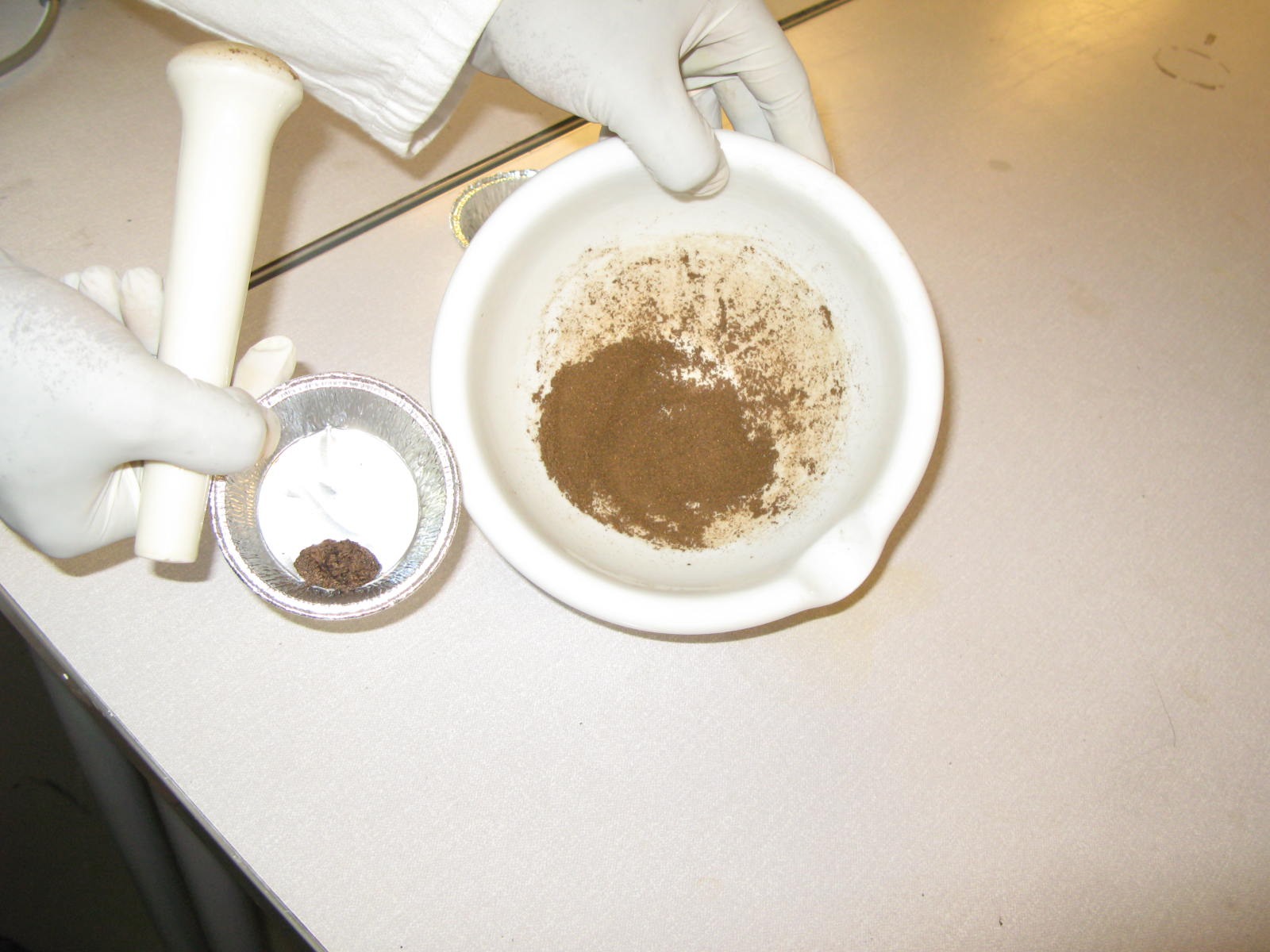
Feces after drying in an experiment to determine moisture content

There are methods available to safely reuse human feces in agriculture as per the "multiple barrier concept" described by the World Health Organization in 2006. The approach to "close the loop" between human excreta (sanitation) and agriculture is also called ecological sanitation. It may involve certain types of dry toilets such as urine-diversion dry toilets or composting toilets.

=== Fecal transplants ===
In humans, fecal transplants (or stool transplant) is the process of transplantation of fecal bacteria from a healthy individual into a recipient who has a certain disease, such as irritable bowel syndrome. The resulting inoculation of healthy gut flora can sometimes improve the physiology of the recipient gut.

Fecal bacteriotherapy—also known as a fecal transplant—is a medical procedure wherein fecal bacteria are transplanted from a healthy individual into a patient. Recent research indicates that this may be a valuable method to re-establish normal gut cultures that have been destroyed through the use of antibiotics or some other medical treatments.

=== Biogas production ===
The biogas produced from feces when it is contained in sewage and treated in an anaerobic digestion process could be worth as much as US$9.5 billion.

Washington DC plans to produce biogas from sewage sludge, the by-product of sewage treatment, which will save US$13 million a year. Teams from the Cambridge Development Initiative, led by Stanford researcher Maisam Pyarali, began a project in 2015 to convert sewage from the slums of Dar Es Salaam into biogas and fertilizer with solar concentrators.

== Paleofeces ==
Paleofeces, also known as coprolites (though that name is more commonly used in reference to animal feces), are ancient human feces, often found as part of archaeological excavations or surveys. Intact feces of ancient people may be found in caves in arid climates and in other locations with suitable preservation conditions. These are studied to determine the diet and health of the people who produced them through the analysis of seeds, small bones, and parasite eggs found inside. They also may be analyzed chemically for more in-depth information on the individual who excreted them, using lipid analysis and DNA analysis. The success rate of usable DNA extraction is relatively high in paleofeces, making it more reliable than skeletal DNA retrieval.

== Society and culture ==
=== Disgust and shame ===
In most human cultures, feces elicit varying degrees of disgust. Disgust is experienced primarily in relation to the sense of taste (either perceived or imagined) and, secondarily to anything that causes a similar feeling by sense of smell, touch, or vision. As such, human feces are regarded as something to be avoided diligently: expelled in private and disposed of immediately and without a trace. It often is considered an unacceptable topic in polite conversation and its mere mention may cause offence in certain contexts.

An example of repulsion by feces from the ancient world is found in the writings called Deuteronomy used by Jews and Christians:

Designate a place outside the camp where you can go to relieve yourself. As part of your equipment have something to dig with, and when you relieve yourself, dig a hole and cover up your excrement. For the LORD your God moves about in your camp to protect you and to deliver your enemies to you. Your camp must be holy, so that he will not see among you anything indecent and turn away from you.

Evolution can explain this disgust since feces are a significant disease vector, carrying many kinds of microorganisms that can sicken humans, including E. coli.

=== Anal cleansing ===
People from different cultures employ a variety of personal cleansing practices after defecation. The anus and buttocks may be either washed with liquids or wiped with toilet paper or other solid materials. In many Muslim, Hindu and Sikh cultures, as well as Southeast Asia and Southern Europe, water is usually used for anal cleansing using a jet, as with a bidet, or most commonly, splashed and washed with the hand. In other cultures (such as many Western countries), cleaning after defecation is generally done with toilet paper only.

=== Terminology and other terms used ===
There are many synonyms in informal registers for human feces. Many are euphemistic, colloquial, or both; some are profane (such as shit), whereas most belong chiefly to child-directed speech (such as poo or poop) or to crude humor (such as turd). An example of an euphemistic term for feces is number two.

== See also ==
- Anal hygiene
- Artist's Shit
- Dirty protest
- Fecal–oral route
- Human right to water and sanitation
- Improved sanitation
- Reuse of human excreta
- Sanitation
- Scatology
- Vermifilter toilet
- Washlet
- Workers' right to access the toilet
