= Tozorakimab =

Monoclonal antibody

Clinical data
- Other names: MEDI 3506

Identifiers
- CAS Number: 2376858-66-9
- DrugBank: DB16473
- UNII: OHZ2MEL7FD
- KEGG: D12375
- ChEBI: CHEBI:758731
- ChEMBL: ChEMBL4650490

Chemical and physical data
- Formula: C_{6414}H_{9956}N_{1708}O_{2006}S_{50}
- Molar mass: 144695.15 g·mol^{−1}

Tozorakimab (formerly MEDI 3506) is a monoclonal antibody that targets interleukin-33 (IL-33) and is currently being evaluated in clinical trials as a treatment for chronic obstructive pulmonary disease. By inhibiting IL-33, this drug downregulates the RAGE and epidermal growth factor receptors.
