= Duffy binding proteins =

Duffy binding domain
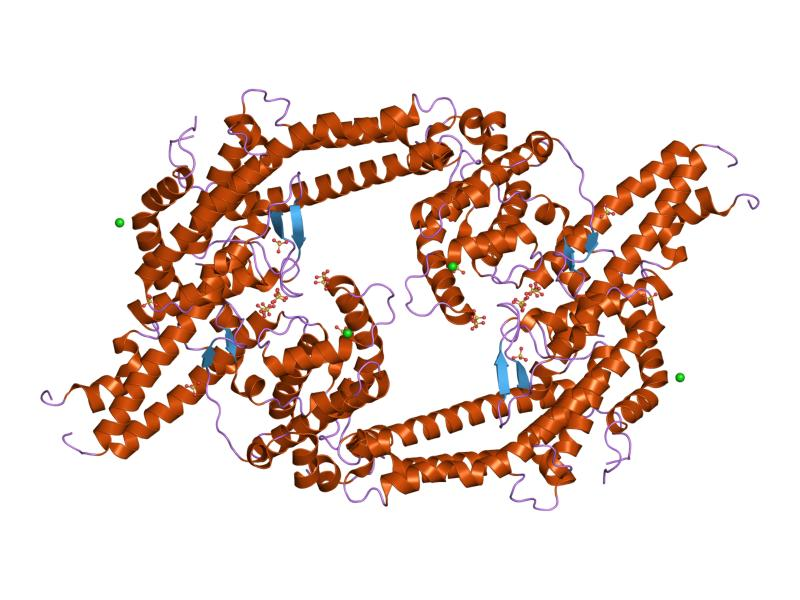
- crystal structure of eba-175 region ii (rii) crystallized in the presence of (alpha)2,3-sialyllactose

Identifiers
- Symbol: Duffy_binding
- Pfam: PF05424
- Pfam clan: CL0195
- InterPro: IPR008602
Available protein structures:
- PDB: IPR008602 PF05424 (ECOD; PDBsum)
- AlphaFold: IPR008602; PF05424

Duffy binding protein N terminal

Identifiers
- Symbol: DuffyBP_N
- Pfam: PF12377
- InterPro: IPR021032
Available protein structures:
- PDB: IPR021032 PF12377 (ECOD; PDBsum)
- AlphaFold: IPR021032; PF12377

In molecular biology, Duffy binding proteins are found in Plasmodium. Plasmodium vivax and Plasmodium knowlesi merozoites invade Homo sapiens erythrocytes that express Duffy blood group surface determinants. The Duffy receptor family is localised in micronemes, an organelle found in all organisms of the phylum Apicomplexa.

The presence of duffy-binding-like domains defines the family of erythrocyte binding-like proteins (EBL), a family of cell invasion proteins universal among Plasmodium. These other members may use some other receptor, for example Glycophorin A. The other universal invasion protein is reticulocyte binding protein homologs. Both families are essential for cell invasion, as they function cooperatively.

A duffy-binding-like domain is also found in proteins of the family Plasmodium falciparum erythrocyte membrane protein 1.

== See also ==
- Genetic resistance to malaria
