= Reticulocyte binding protein homologs =

Economy of dhule

Plasmodium falciparum reticulocyte-binding protein homolog 5 (RH5), coiled-coil domain

Identifiers
- Symbol: Rf5
- Pfam: PF18515
- InterPro: IPR041668
Available protein structures:
- Pfam: structures / ECOD
- PDB: RCSB PDB; PDBe; PDBj
- PDBsum: structure summary

Reticulocyte binding protein homologs (RHs) are a superfamily of proteins found in Plasmodium responsible for cell invasion. Together with the family of erythrocyte binding-like proteins (EBLs) they make up the two families of invasion proteins universal to Plasmodium. The two families function cooperatively.

This family is named after the reticulocyte binding proteins in P. vivax, a parasite that only infects reticulocytes (immature red blood cells) expressing the Duffy antigen. Homologs have since been identified in P. yoelii and P. reichenowi.

A P. falciparum protein complex called PfRH5-PfCyRPA-PfRipr (RCR) is known to bind basigin via the tip of RH5. The trimeric complex forms an elongated structure with RH5 and Ripr on distal ends and CyRPA in the middle. The RCR complex has been identified as a promising malaria vaccine target with each individual component capable of inducing strain transcending immunity in in vitro assays of parasite growth. Of the entire family of RHs, only RH5 appears to be essential for invasion and functions downstream of the other RHs during invasion.

PfRH4 is known to bind complement receptor 1.

RHs do not express any significant sequence feature for specific domains, except for a set of transmembrane helices at the C-terminal. From experimentation on partial proteins, RHs are known to contain enterocyte-binding and nucleotide-sensing domains (EBD and NBD) that may partially overlap. The structure of the EBD has been experimentally observed in 2011 by small angle X-ray scattering. A much better crystal structure for an N-terminal receptor-binding domain (presumably the same as EBD) was published in 2014.
