= S100A12 =

Protein found in humans

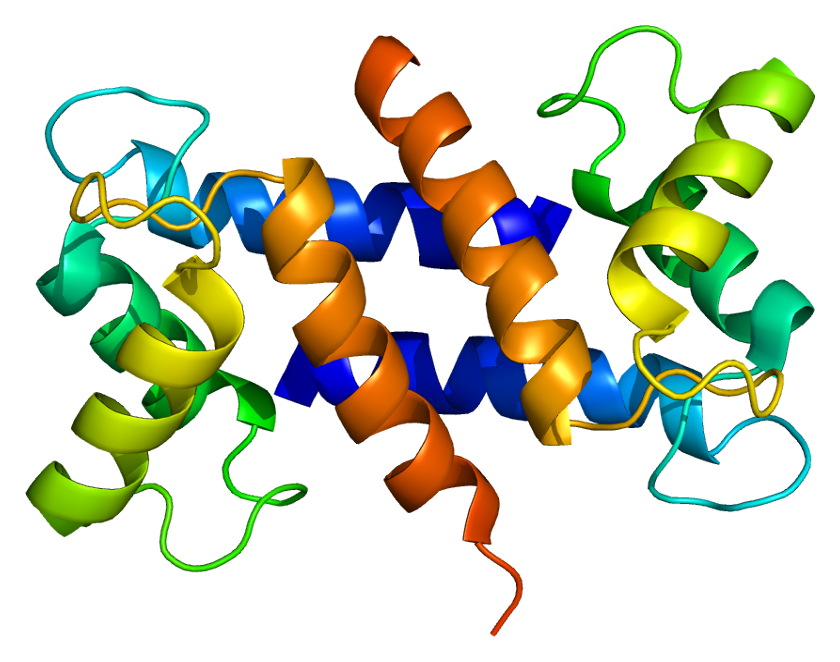

Identifiers
- Aliases: S100A12, CAAF1, CAGC, CGRP, ENRAGE, MRP-6, MRP6, p6, S100 calcium binding protein A12, EN-RAGE
- External IDs: OMIM: 603112; GeneCards: S100A12
Available structures
PDB	Human UniProt search: PDBe RCSB
PDB	List of PDB id codes 1E8A, 1GQM, 1ODB, 2M9G, 2WC8, 2WCB, 2WCE, 2WCF

Gene location (Human)
Chr.	Chromosome 1 (human)
Band	1q21.3	Start	153,373,711 bp
Band	1q21.3	End	153,375,621 bp
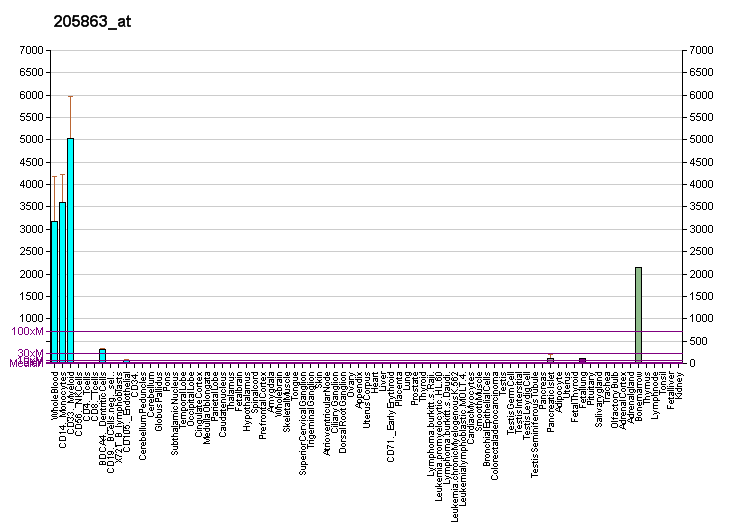
RNA expression pattern
Bgee	Human / Mouse (ortholog); Top expressed in: trabecular bone; monocyte; bone marrow; granulocyte; bone marrow cell; blood; right lung; periodontal fiber; spleen; upper lobe of left lung / n/a; More reference expression data
BioGPS	More reference expression data
Gene ontology
Molecular function	calcium ion binding; zinc ion binding; metal ion binding; protein binding; RAGE receptor binding; copper ion binding
Cellular component	cytoplasm; cytosol; membrane; plasma membrane; extracellular region; cytoskeleton; nucleus; secretory granule lumen
Biological process	mast cell activation; positive regulation of inflammatory response; positive regulation of MAP kinase activity; monocyte chemotaxis; immune system process; defense response to fungus; neutrophil chemotaxis; defense response to bacterium; positive regulation of NF-kappaB transcription factor activity; positive regulation of I-kappaB kinase/NF-kappaB signaling; xenobiotic metabolic process; innate immune response; inflammatory response; neutrophil degranulation; antimicrobial humoral immune response mediated by antimicrobial peptide; killing of cells of other organism
Sources:Amigo / QuickGO
Orthologs
Databases	NCBI: entry; OMA: entry
Species	Human	Mouse
Entrez	6283	n/a
Ensembl	ENSG00000163221	n/a
UniProt	P80511	n/a
RefSeq (mRNA)	NM_005621	n/a
RefSeq (protein)	NP_005612	n/a
Location (UCSC)	Chr 1: 153.37 – 153.38 Mb	n/a
PubMed search		n/a
- Wikidata
View/Edit Human

S100 calcium-binding protein A12 (S100A12) is a protein that in humans is encoded by the S100A12 gene. Human S100A12, also known as calgranulin C, was first described in 1995.

The protein encoded by this gene is a member of the S100 family of proteins containing 2 EF-hand calcium-binding motifs.

== Function ==
Generally, S100A12 has a significant anti-infectious and antibacterial role that is related to its ability to uptake ions. For example, it inhibits the spread and virulence of H. pylori.

== Tissue distribution ==
Neutrophils and monocytes / macrophages are important source of S100A12 in the cell although some epithelial cells and dendritic cells are capable of its secretion. Some tissues are rich in these cells, and so in this protein. These include the spleen or lungs. It occurs intracellularly but is also produced into the extracellular environment where it occurs as a homodimer or hexamer.

== Clinical significance ==
Its presence is associated with cardiovascular and kidney diseases. Like other S100 proteins, S100A12 signals through the RAGE receptor and TLR. In general, this signalling leads to cytokine production, chemotaxis and increased oxidative stress. In endothelial cells, this signaling leads to activation of NFκB, under which the production of adhesion molecules such as ICAMs, VCAM or selectins is increased. This protein is proposed to be involved in specific calcium-dependent signal transduction pathways and its regulatory effect on cytoskeletal components may modulate various neutrophil activities.

Cascades that are triggered by interaction of S100A12 with RAGE may play an important role in renal failure in hemodialysis patients. The relationship between S100A12 and renal dialysis mortality rates has been repeatedly reported. S100A12 may play a role in monitoring SLE patients as a marker of kidney damage in glomerulonephritis. It is also associated with gastrointestinal diseases. In inflammatory bowel diseases, it significantly correlates with disease activity and, together with other 100S family proteins, can predict disease relapse.
