= Fecal pH test =

- Synonyms: faecal pH test, stool acidity test
- LOINC: 2755-7

A faecal pH test is one where a specimen of faeces is tested for acidity in order to diagnose a medical condition.

The pH of human faeces is variable but the average is pH 6.6 (acidic) for normal faeces. A lower faecal pH (very acidic stool) can indicate a digestive problem such poor absorption of carbohydrates or fats, lactose intolerance, an infection such as E. coli or rotavirus, or overgrowth of acid-producing bacteria (such as lactic acid bacteria).

== Test procedure ==
The test is fast and can be performed in a doctor's office. A patient must not be receiving antibiotics. At least half a milliliter of feces is collected, and a strip of nitrazine paper is dipped in the sample and compared against a color scale. A pH of less than 5.5 indicates an acidic sample.

== Results ==
Unhealthy individuals with a higher or lower pH rate have been observed having a higher mortality rate. A high alkaline pH rating is associated with the body's inability to create enough acid along with undigested food.

== See also ==
- Stool test
