= Calgranulin =

Protein

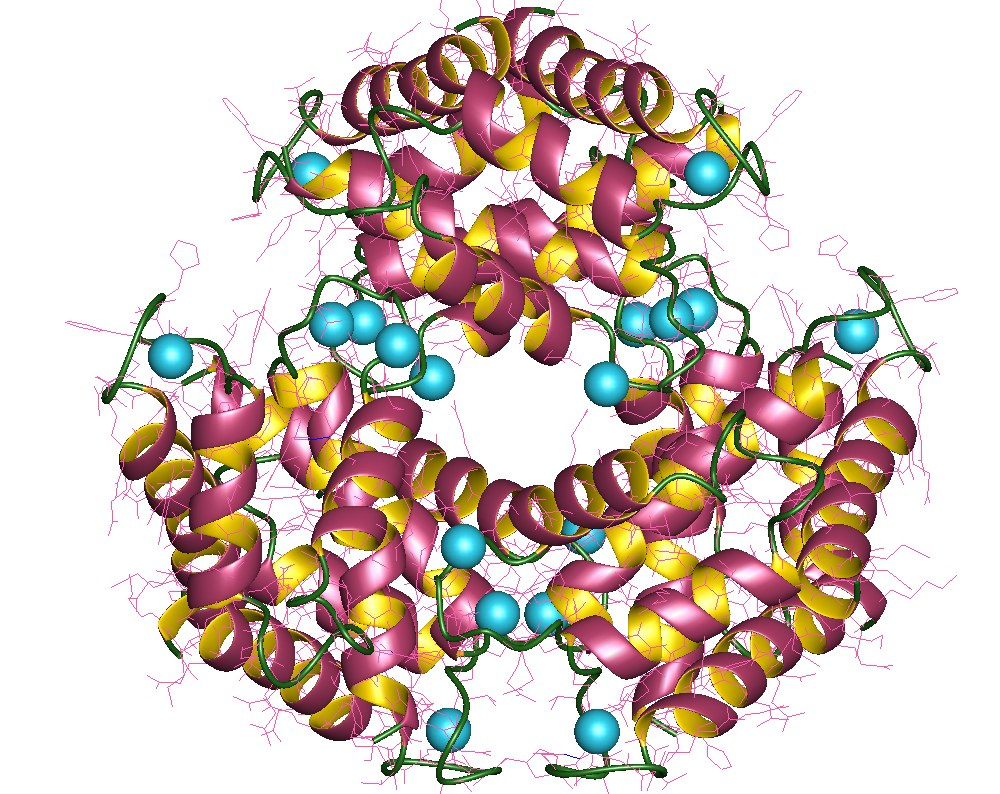
Calgranulin C hexamer, Human.

Calgranulin is an S100 calcium-binding protein that is expressed in multiple cell types, including renal epithelial cells and neutrophils.

The proteins S100A8 and S100A9 form a heterodimer called calprotectin.

== Human genes ==
- S100A8 (calgranulin A)
- S100A9 (calgranulin B)
- S100A12 (calgranulin C)

== Function ==
Some in vitro evidence suggests that calgranulin can inhibit the precipitation of calcium oxalate in a urine-like environment at calgranulin concentrations below physiological concentrations. Thus, it may also function in vivo as an inhibitor of calcium oxalate kidney stone formation. However, the role of calgranulin in the stone formation process has not been evaluated.

== See also ==
- Measurement of faecal calprotectin
