= Azeliragon =

Names
- IUPAC name 3-[4-[2-butyl-1-[4-(4-chlorophenoxy)phenyl]imidazol-4-yl]phenoxy]-N,N-diethylpropan-1-amine

Identifiers
CAS Number	603148-36-3
3D model (JSmol)	Interactive image
ChEMBL	ChEMBL3989929
ChemSpider	9355214
DrugBank	DB12689
EC Number	814-441-9
IUPHAR/BPS	8317
KEGG	D11147
PubChem CID	11180124
UNII	LPU25F15UQ
CompTox Dashboard (EPA)	DTXSID601117468
- InChI: InChI=1S/C32H38ClN3O2/c1-4-7-9-32-34-31(25-10-16-28(17-11-25)37-23-8-22-35(5-2)6-3)24-36(32)27-14-20-30(21-15-27)38-29-18-12-26(33)13-19-29/h10-21,24H,4-9,22-23H2,1-3H3 Key: KJNNWYBAOPXVJY-UHFFFAOYSA-N
- SMILES: CCCCC1=NC(=CN1C2=CC=C(C=C2)OC3=CC=C(C=C3)Cl)C4=CC=C(C=C4)OCCCN(CC)CC

Properties
Chemical formula	C_{32}H_{38}ClN_{3}O_{2}
Molar mass	532.13 g·mol^{−1}
- Except where otherwise noted, data are given for materials in their standard state (at 25 °C [77 °F], 100 kPa). Infobox references

Azeliragon (TTP488 or PF-04494700) is a small-molecule RAGE inhibitor. It is developed by vTv Therapeutics for various cancers, including triple-negative breast cancer and pancreatic cancer.

The chemical reached Phase III trials in slowing cognitive deterioration in early stage Alzheimer's disease patients. It was also tested in people with diabetic neuropathy and animal models of graft-vs-host disease.
