= Tasquinimod =

Chemical compound

Legal status
- Legal status: Experimental

Pharmacokinetic data
- Elimination half-life: 40 ± 16 hours

Identifiers
- IUPAC name: 4-Hydroxy-5-methoxy-N,1-dimethyl-2-oxo-N-[4-(trifluoromethyl)phenyl]-1,2-dihydroquinoline-3-carboxamide
- CAS Number: 254964-60-8
- PubChem CID: 54682876
- IUPHAR/BPS: 8098
- ChemSpider: 11444963
- UNII: 756U07KN1R
- ChEMBL: ChEMBL2107784
- CompTox Dashboard (EPA): DTXSID90180183

Chemical and physical data
- Formula: C_{20}H_{17}F_{3}N_{2}O_{4}
- Molar mass: 406.361 g·mol^{−1}
- 3D model (JSmol): Interactive image
- SMILES: CN1C2=C(C(=CC=C2)OC)C(=C(C1=O)C(=O)N(C)C3=CC=C(C=C3)C(F)(F)F)O
- InChI: InChI=1S/C20H17F3N2O4/c1-24(12-9-7-11(8-10-12)20(21,22)23)18(27)16-17(26)15-13(25(2)19(16)28)5-4-6-14(15)29-3/h4-10,26H,1-3H3; Key:ONDYALNGTUAJDX-UHFFFAOYSA-N

Tasquinimod (ABR-215050, CID 54682876) is an experimental drug currently being investigated for the treatment of solid tumors. Tasquinimod has been mostly studied in prostate cancer, but its mechanism of action suggests that it could be used to treat other cancers. Castration-resistant prostate cancer (CRPC), formerly called hormone-resistant or hormone-refractory prostate cancer, is prostate cancer that grows despite medical or surgical androgen deprivation therapy. Tasquinimod targets the tumor microenvironment and counteracts cancer development by inhibiting angiogenesis and metastasis and by modulating the immune system. It is now in phase III development, following successful phase II trial outcomes.

== History ==
Collaborative studies by laboratories at Johns Hopkins School of Medicine and Active Biotech Research AB identified tasquinimod as the lead agent for developing a treatment for prostate cancer. Tasquinimod was one of several second-generation quinoline-3-carboxamide variants synthesized using the drug roquinimex as a starting point, and it performed well in pre-clinical studies of cancer models.

In April 2011, Ipsen and Active Biotech entered into a broad partnership for the co-development of tasquinimod for the treatment of cancer. Active Biotech granted Ipsen exclusive rights to commercialize tasquinimod worldwide, except in North and South America and Japan where Active Biotech retained all commercial and marketing rights.

== Mechanism of action ==
Tasquinimod is a novel small-molecule inhibitor that targets the tumor microenvironment by controlling the accumulation and immunosuppressive, pro-angiogenic and pro-metastatic functions of regulatory myeloid cells (also called myeloid-derived suppressor cells). It binds to and inhibits the interactions of S100A9, an immunomodulatory protein that promotes tumor development, influences suppressive and pro-angiogenic cells in the tumor microenvironment, and participates in the establishment of pre-metastatic niches.

Tasquinimod may also target the tumor microenvironment by suppressing the tumor hypoxic response, in which genes involved in the adaptation and survival of cells during hypoxia are induced. Tasquinimod reduces tumor angiogenesis; but its anti-angiogenic effects do not appear to be linked to vascular endothelial growth factor (VEGF) neutralization or VEGF receptor tyrosine kinase inhibition.

== Clinical studies ==
A randomized, double-blind, placebo-controlled phase II study comparing tasquinimod with placebo in 206 men with metastatic CRPC was completed in 2009. The primary endpoint in the trial was to show a difference in the number of patients with disease progression at 6 months. The proportion of patients who were disease progression-free after 6 months was 69% for patients treated with tasquinimod versus 37% for placebo-treated patients (p<0.001). Median progression-free survival (PFS) was significantly improved in patients treated with tasquinimod compared with patients receiving placebo (7.6 vs 3.3 months; hazard ratio [HR] 0.57; 95% confidence interval [CI] 0.39, 0.85, p=0.0042). Tasquinimod thus delayed disease progression by about 4.3 months. Overall survival (OS) observed for tasquinimod-treated patients was longer than previously reported in this patient population. Median overall survival was 33.4 months for the tasquinimod group versus 30.4 months for the placebo group (p=0.49). Using a multivariate analysis, treatment with tasquinimod was associated with an OS advantage with a HR of 0.64 (95% CI 0.42, 0.97, p=0.034). It was hypothesized that the prolongation in PFS observed with tasquinimod treatment may lead to a survival advantage in men with metastatic CRPC. Also, a stronger trend for survival benefit was seen in patients with bone metastases; 34.2 for the tasquinimod group vs 27.1 months for the placebo group (HR 0.73, 95% CI 0.46, 1.17, p=0.19).

Analysis of up to 3 years of safety data from phase II studies showed that treatment-related adverse events were mild to moderate, manageable and less frequent after 2 months of therapy. Adverse events observed included gastrointestinal disorders, fatigue, musculoskeletal pain as well as elevations of some laboratory parameters.

A phase III randomized controlled trial called 10TASQ10 to confirm tasquinimod's effect on disease progression is ongoing. More than 1,200 patients with asymptomatic to mildly symptomatic metastatic CRPC were successfully enrolled in the study, as planned in the clinical protocol. The study is expected to complete in 2016. Other indications are currently under investigation.
