= Stool test =

Medical examination of fecal matter

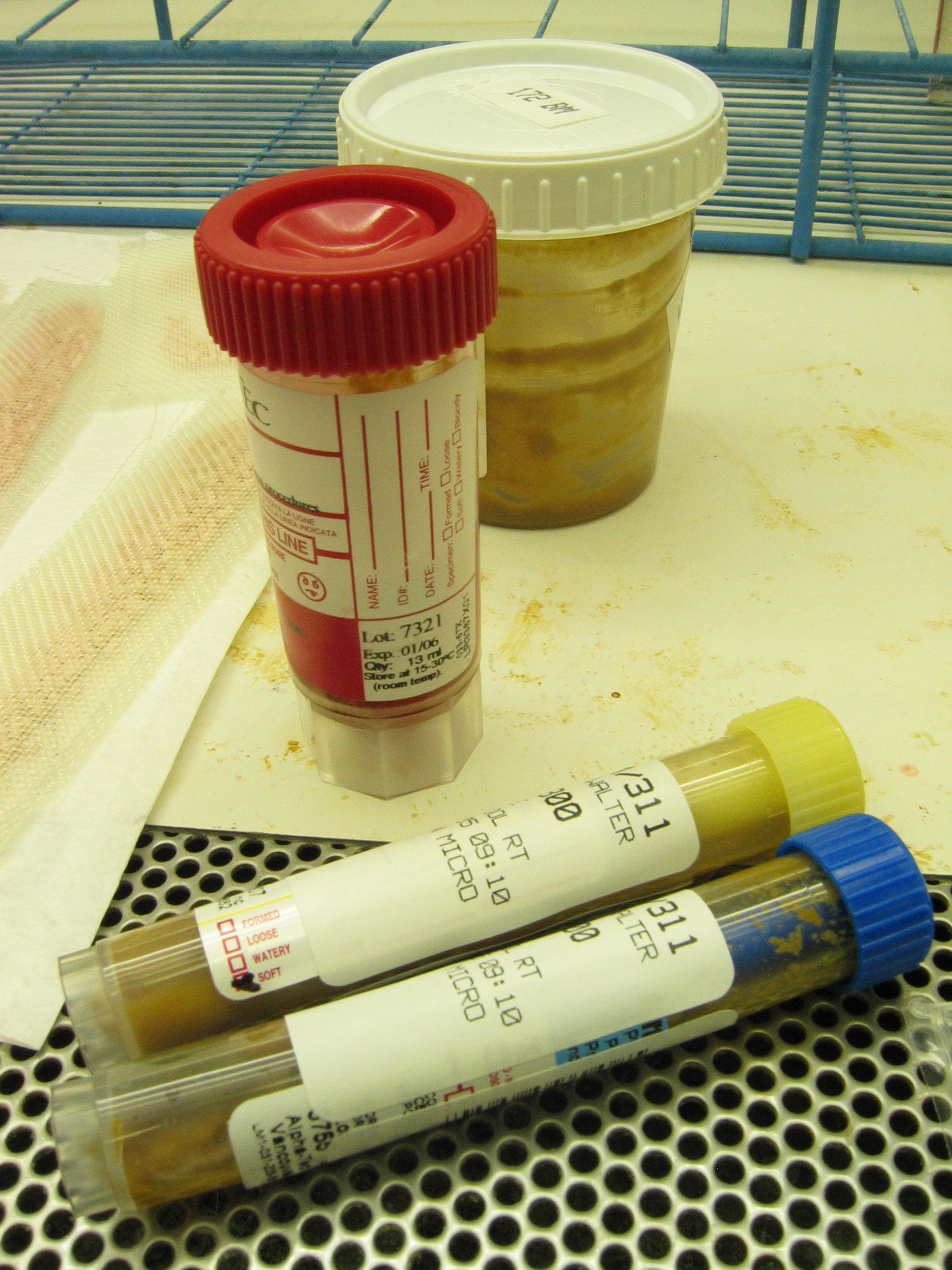
- Transport vials filled with human feces for stool testing. Yellow and blue tops for parasite testing, red top for stool cultures and the white top was provided by the patient with the sample.
- Purpose: diagnose if medical condition is present

A stool test is a medical diagnostic technique that involves the collection and analysis of fecal matter. Microbial analysis (culturing), microscopy and chemical tests are among the tests performed on stool samples.

== Collection ==
Stool samples should be sent to the laboratory as soon as possible after collection and should not be refrigerated prior to by the laboratory.

== Visual examination ==
The patient and/or health care worker in the office or at the bedside is able to make some important observations.

- Color
- Texture/consistency—formed
- Classify type of feces (diagnostic triad for irritable bowel syndrome) based on Bristol stool scale

== Cancer screening ==
Fecal occult blood test and fecal immunochemical test are the most common stool tests to diagnose many conditions that cause bleeding in the gastrointestinal system, including colorectal cancer or stomach cancer. The American College of Gastroenterology has recommended the abandoning of gFOBT testing as a colorectal cancer screening tool, in favor of the fecal immunochemical test (FIT). The newer and recommended tests look for globin, DNA, or other blood factors including transferrin, while conventional stool guaiac tests look for heme.

Cancers, and to a lesser extent, precancerous lesions, shed abnormal cells into the stool. Cancers and precancerous lesions (polyps) that are ulcerated or rubbed by passing stool also may shed blood into the stool, which can be identified by a hemoglobin assay.

The American Cancer Society and the U.S. Preventive Services Task Force recommended colorectal cancer screening with a fecal immunochemical test every year, or a multi-target stool DNA test for every three years from the age of 45. Other options include a sigmoidoscopy or virtual colonoscopy (CT colonography) for every five years or a colonoscopy for every 10 years. Fecal occult blood test is no longer recommended due to the high false-positive rate as well as the dietary and pharmaceutical restrictions. The National Committee for Quality Assurance (NCQA) issued an update to the Healthcare Effectiveness Data and Information Set (HEDIS) for 2017, while the guideline remains for the patients aged 50 or over.

A multi-target stool DNA test was approved in August 2014 by the FDA as a screening test for non-symptomatic, average-risk adults 50 years or older. A 2017 study found this testing to be less cost effective compared to colonoscopy or fecal occult blood testing. Three-year multi-target stool DNA test has been estimated to cost $11,313 per quality-adjusted life year (QALY) compared with no screening.

== Microbiology tests ==
Parasitic diseases such as ascariasis, hookworm, strongyloidiasis and whipworm can be diagnosed by examining stools under a microscope for the presence of worm larvae or eggs. Some bacterial diseases can be detected with a stool culture. Toxins from bacteria such as Clostridioides difficile (C. diff) can also be identified. Viruses such as rotavirus can also be found in stools. Other stool tests involve the detection of antibiotic resistance as to guide appropriate therapy, e.g. Clarithromycin resistance of Helicobacter pylori represents a major challenge in eradication therapy but the responsible bacterial genomic markers can be detected in stool using PCR technology and thus can guide the prescription of the appropriate antibiotics to specific patients.

== Chemical tests ==
A fecal pH test may be used to determine lactose intolerance or the presence of an infection. Steatorrhea can be diagnosed using a fecal fat test, which checks for the malabsorption of fat.

Faecal elastase levels are becoming the mainstay of pancreatitis diagnosis.

== See also ==
- Rectal examination
- Calprotectin examination
