= Fecal immunochemical test =

Diagnostic test for colorectal cancer

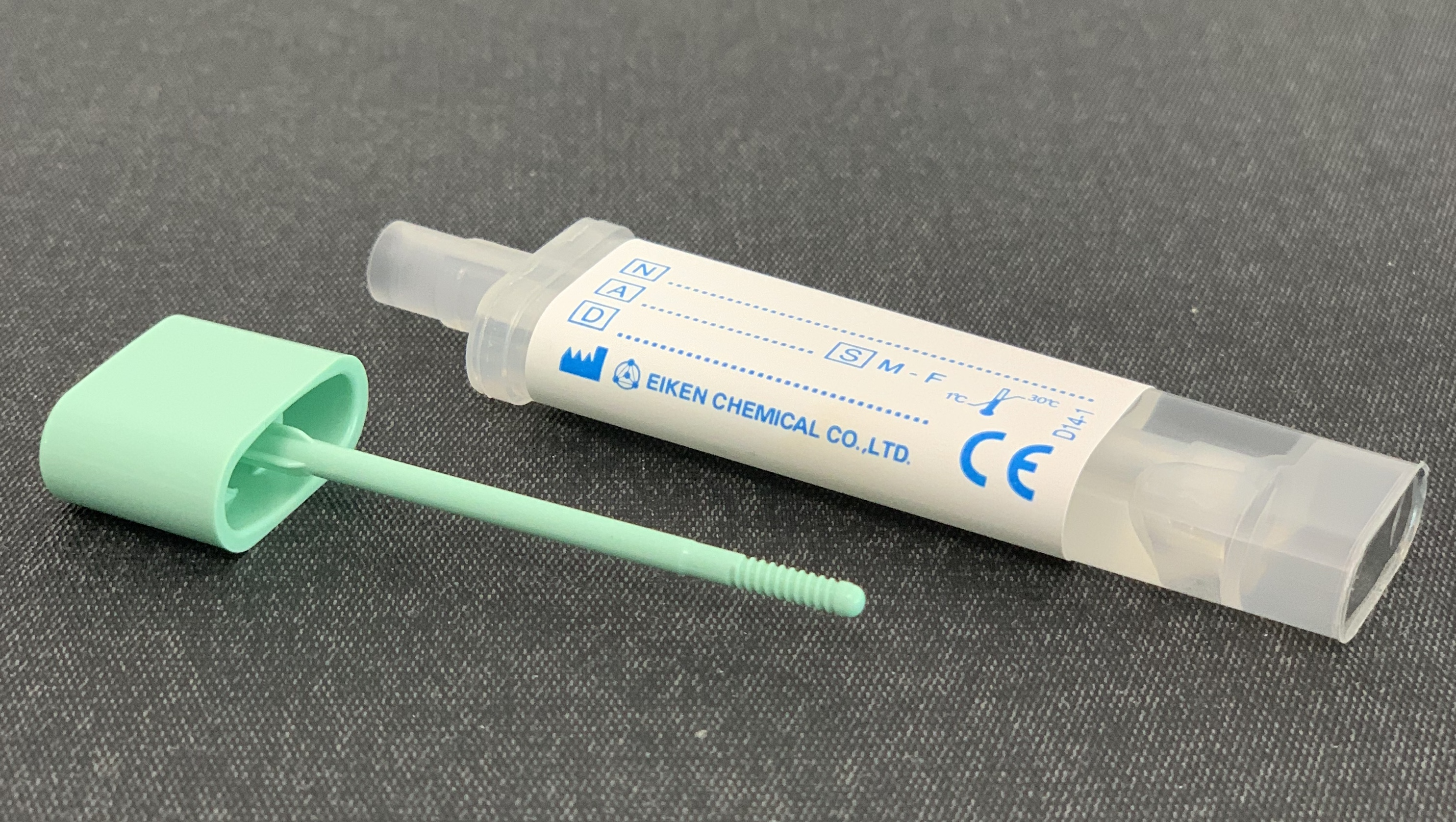
- Faecal Immunochemical Testing
- [edit on Wikidata]

The fecal immunochemical test (FIT) is a diagnostic technique that examines stool samples for traces of non-visible blood, which could potentially indicate conditions including colorectal cancer (CRC).

== Mechanism and effectiveness ==
Blood in stools does not always mean the presence of bowel or anal cancer, it could be from other bowel diseases such as ulcerative colitis, Crohn's disease or even hemorrhoids.

A 2016 paper suggests that, when FIT is used in conjunction with microbiota testing, sensitivity for detecting colonic cancer and adenomas may be increased compared to either type of testing alone.

== Clinical use ==
FIT may be performed every 1-2 years as a screening test for colorectal cancer in older adults.

A 2022 UK guideline suggests prioritizing patients with both lower GI symptoms, and faecal haemoglobin ≥10 μg per 1g stool, for urgent referral for colorectal cancer investigation; patients who do not need meet this threshold may still be referred for further investigation based on symptoms and other factors, and should not be excluded based on this test alone.

While UK guidelines now recommend using FIT in primary care to prioritize symptomatic patients for CRC investigation, in the US, FIT is mainly used as a screening test only, and colonoscopies are still considered the standard diagnostic approach for patients with symptoms suggestive of CRC, and some clinics (e.g. Mayo Clinic) recommend against the use of FIT in such patients.
