= Calprotectin =

Protein complex found in mammals

Calprotectin is a complex of the mammalian proteins S100A8 and S100A9. Other names for calprotectin include MRP8-MRP14, calgranulin A and B, cystic fibrosis antigen, L1, 60BB antigen, and 27E10 antigen. The proteins exist as homodimers but preferentially exist as S100A8/A9 heterodimers or heterotetramers (calprotectin) with antimicrobial, proinflammatory and prothrombotic properties. In the presence of calcium, calprotectin is capable of sequestering the transition metals iron, manganese and zinc via chelation. This metal sequestration affords the complex antimicrobial properties. Calprotectin is the only known antimicrobial manganese sequestration protein complex. Calprotectin comprises as much as 60% of the soluble protein content of the cytosol of a neutrophil, and it is secreted by an unknown mechanism during inflammation. Faecal calprotectin has been used to detect intestinal inflammation (colitis or enteritis) and can serve as a biomarker for inflammatory bowel diseases. Blood-based calprotectin (in serum and plasma) is used in diagnostics of multiple inflammatory diseases, including autoimmune diseases, like arthritis, and severe infections including sepsis.

== Structure ==
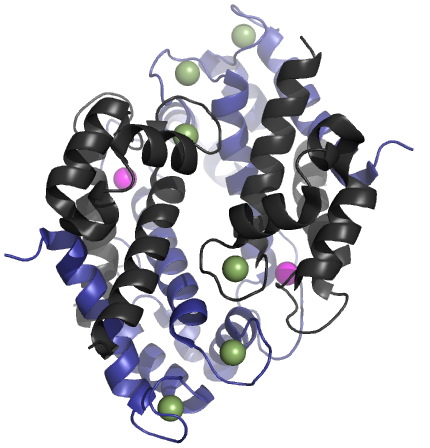
Crystal structure of Mn^{2+} and Ca^{2+} loaded calprotectin, showing two S100A8-S100A9 dimers. The grey and blue chains represent S100A8 and S100A9, respectively. Purple spheres represent Mn^{2+} and green spheres represent Ca^{2+}. Only one manganese ion can bind per calprotectin dimer.

The human homologue of calprotectin is a 24 kDa dimer, and is formed by the protein monomers S100A8 (10,835 Da) and S100A9 (13,242 Da). The primary structure of calprotectin can vary between species. For instance, the mouse homologue of S100A8 is 10,295 Da, while the S100A9 homologue is 13,049 Da. Early size exclusion chromatography experiments incorrectly indicated that calprotectin had a molecular mass of 36.5 kDa; occasionally this value is used in contemporary literature. Calprotectin S100A8-S100A9 dimers can non-covalently pair with one another to form 48 kDa tetramers.

=== Metal binding ===
Calprotectin has a high affinity for calcium, zinc, iron, and manganese. Each of S100A8 and S100A9 contain two EF-hand type Ca^{2+} binding sites, and calprotectin is able to bind a total of four calcium ions per dimer or eight calcium ions per tetramer. Calcium binding induces a conformational change in the complex that improves its affinity for transition metals, and promotes tetramer formation. A maximum of two transition metal ions may bind to each calprotectin S100A8-S100A9 dimer.

A calprotectin dimer can bind only one manganese or iron ion with high affinity, and it can do this only in the presence of calcium. Zinc can bind at two sites within the calprotectin dimer, and this can occur in the absence of calcium. Calcium, however, improves calprotectin's affinity for zinc. While calprotectin metal binding occurs at the interface of S100A9 and S100A8 monomers, the independent monomers have some capacity for zinc binding, and may contribute to zinc homeostasis within mammals.

His_{6} coordination of Mn^{2+} in calprotectin. S100A8 histidine residues are coloured grey, S100A9 histidine residues are coloured purple.

The first of the two calprotectin metal binding sites consists of a His_{3}Asp motif, with S100A8 contributing two histidine ligands (His83 and His87), and S100A9 contributing a histidine and an aspartic acid ligand (His20 and Asp30). The second site can coordinate metals through a tetra-histidine (His_{4}) or a hexa-histidine (His_{6}) binding motif. In the case of His_{4} binding, S100A8 coordinates through both His17 and His27 while S100A9 coordinates through His91 and His95. In hexa-histidine binding two further histidine residues, His103 and His105, are recruited from the C-terminal end of S100A9 to enable octahedral coordination of the transition metal. Manganese or iron are bound by the calprotectin dimer at this His_{6} site. Zinc can be bound to either of the sites that form at the interface between S100A8 and S100A9 monomers.

== Inflammatory disease ==
Calprotectin constitutes up to 60% of soluble protein content in the cytosol of neutrophil granulocytes, and it can be found at a lower concentration in monocytes, macrophages, and squamous epithelial cells. Calprotectin enters into pus and abscess fluid during neutrophil cell death, along with other antimicrobial proteins.

Mammalian cells secrete calprotectin during the inflammatory response. Circulating activated platelets and platelet-leukocyte aggregates are increased in acute and chronic sterile thrombo-inflammatory diseases. Plasma calprotectin is elevated in persons with metabolic syndrome, a disease characterized by chronic inflammation. Calprotectin is secreted in the mouth during inflammation of the gingiva and during oral candidiasis infection. People who have mutations in the calprotectin gene appear susceptible to serious gum infections. Manganese sequestration by calprotectin is likely important during lung inflammation. The exact mechanism by which S100A8 and S100A9 is secreted by mammalian cells during inflammation remains unknown. In lung autopsies from patients with inflammation caused by COVID-19, heterodimeric S100A8/A9 is mainly detected in neutrophils and deposited on vessel walls. Platelet glycoprotein Ib alpha (GP1BA;GPIbα) is the receptor for S100A8/A9 on platelets. In vitro, platelets adhere to and partially spread on S100A8/A9, leading to the formation of distinct populations of P-selectin^{+} and phosphatidylserine^{+} platelets. The prothrombotic pathway initiated by interaction of S100A8/A9 with GPIbα induces the formation of procoagulant platelets and fibrin (CD36 has a supporting role).

== Antimicrobial properties ==
Transition metals are essential to the survival of all organisms. Mammals strictly limit metal availability as a part of the innate immune system, and this helps prevent infection by microbes and fungi. Calprotectin was first described in the 1980s as a mammalian antimicrobial protein that acts through the sequestration of zinc. It is now known that calprotectin also has antibacterial and antifungal properties that arise from its ability to sequester manganese and iron. Calprotectin is the only known antimicrobial agent that acts through manganese sequestration. Calprotectin is one of many antimicrobial effectors associated with neutrophil extracellular traps (NETs).

== Faecal calprotectin ==
Calprotectin becomes available in the intestinal lumen via leukocyte shedding, active secretion, cell disturbance, and cell death. This results in elevated faecal calprotectin levels, which can be detected in the stool. Elevated faecal calprotectin levels therefore indicate migration of neutrophils into the intestinal mucosa, which occurs during intestinal inflammation. As people with active inflammatory bowel diseases (IBD) such as ulcerative colitis or Crohn's disease have as much as a 10-fold increase in faecal calprotectin levels, the measurement of faecal calprotectin can serve as a biochemical test for these diseases.

Although a relatively new test, faecal calprotectin is regularly used as an indicator for IBD during treatment and as a diagnostic marker. Faecal calprotectin tests can also function in distinguishing patients with irritable bowel syndrome from those with IBD. Calprotectin is useful as a marker, as it is resistant to enzymatic degradation, and can be easily measured in faeces. Although faecal calprotectin correlates significantly with disease activity in people with confirmed IBD, elevated faecal calprotectin can be a false-positive indicator of IBD under some conditions. Importantly, intake of proton pump inhibitor is associated with significantly elevated calprotectin values. Furthermore, positive faecal calprotectin does not help in localizing IBD, or in distinguishing ulcerative colitis from Crohn's disease. Faecal calprotectin can also indicate other gastrointestinal conditions such as colorectal cancer, gastroenteritis, and food intolerance. Calprotectin levels vary depending on age, comorbidity, and may vary day-to-day within individuals. Faecal calprotectin could be used as a preliminary screen in otherwise functional patients suspected of having IBD, or as a means of following mucosal healing. In patients with SARS-CoV-2 infection, elevated faecal calprotectin has been demonstrated to correlated with COVID-19 induced thrombosis even in patients without gastrointestinal symptoms. The potential for using faecal calprotectin in this way is debated, however, and cut-off levels have not been agreed upon.

== See also ==
- Zinc in biology
- Manganese in biology
- Nutritional role of calcium
- Bioinorganic chemistry
