= S100A8 =

Protein found in humans

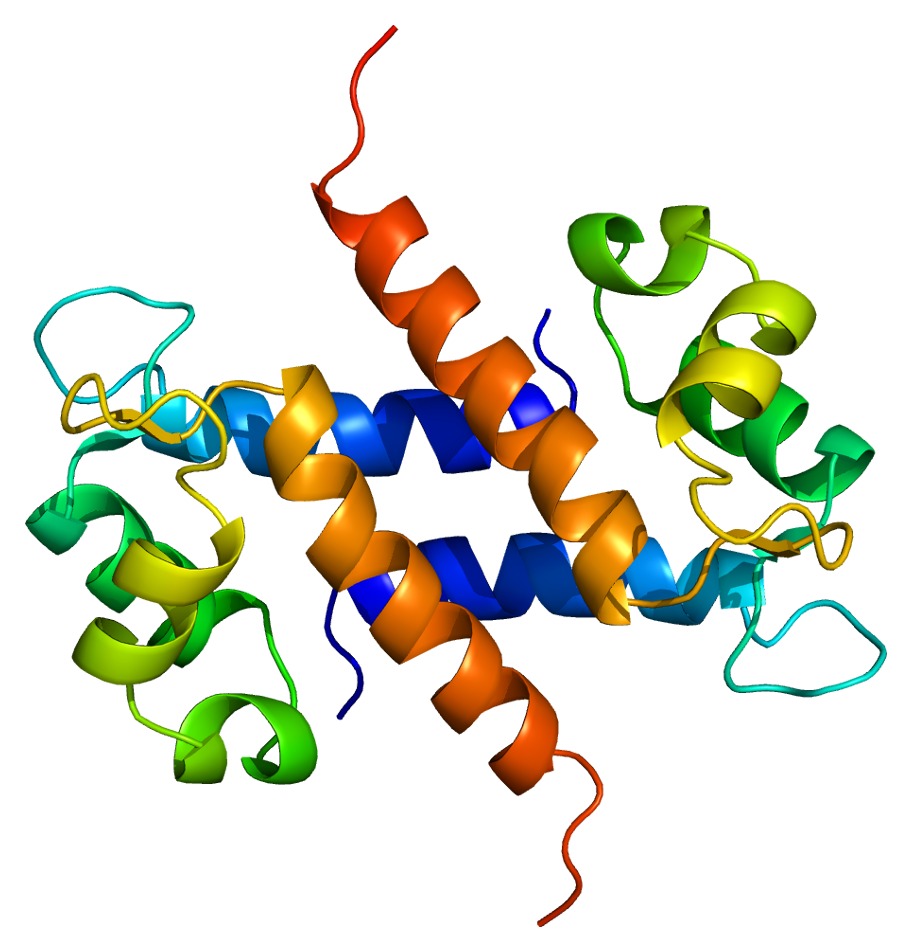

Identifiers
- Aliases: S100A8, 60B8AG, CAGA, CFAG, CGLA, CP-10, L1Ag, MA387, MIF, MRP8, NIF, P8, S100 calcium binding protein A8, S100-A8
- External IDs: OMIM: 123885; MGI: 88244; GeneCards: S100A8
Available structures
PDB	Ortholog search: PDBe RCSB
PDB	List of PDB id codes 1MR8, 1XK4, 4GGF, 4XJK, 5HLO, 5HLV

Gene location (Human)
Chr.	Chromosome 1 (human)
Band	1q21.3	Start	153,390,032 bp
Band	1q21.3	End	153,391,073 bp

Gene location (Mouse)
Chr.	Chromosome 3 (mouse)
Band	3 F1|3 39.9 cM	Start	90,576,285 bp
Band	3 F1|3 39.9 cM	End	90,577,342 bp
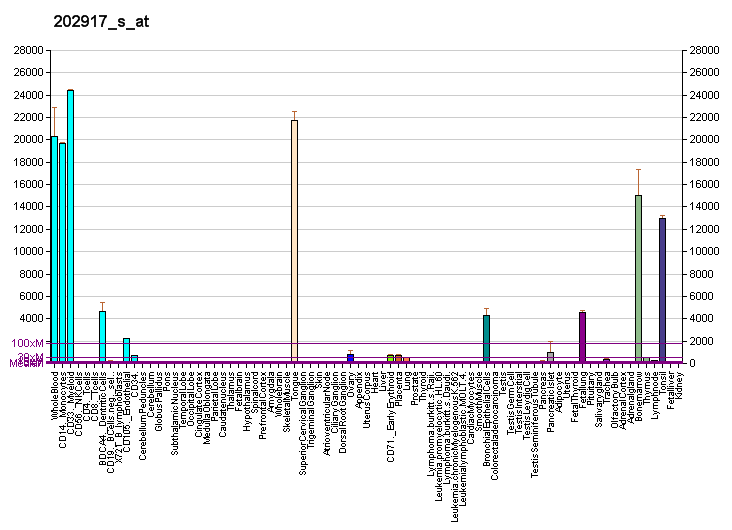
RNA expression pattern
Bgee	Human / Mouse (ortholog); Top expressed in: mucosa of pharynx; gums; body of tongue; oral cavity; trabecular bone; gingival epithelium; periodontal fiber; monocyte; bone marrow; vulva / Top expressed in: granulocyte; tibiofemoral joint; gastrula; femur; body of femur; fetal liver hematopoietic progenitor cell; decidua; human fetus; spleen; blood; More reference expression data
BioGPS	More reference expression data
Gene ontology
Molecular function	Toll-like receptor 4 binding; RAGE receptor binding; microtubule binding; protein binding; calcium ion binding; arachidonic acid binding; zinc ion binding; metal ion binding
Cellular component	nucleus; cytoskeleton; cytosol; extracellular exosome; membrane; plasma membrane; cytoplasm; extracellular space; secretory granule lumen; intermediate filament cytoskeleton; extracellular region; collagen-containing extracellular matrix
Biological process	regulation of inflammatory response; activation of cysteine-type endopeptidase activity involved in apoptotic process; immune system process; positive regulation of inflammatory response; neutrophil chemotaxis; positive regulation of intrinsic apoptotic signaling pathway; defense response to fungus; response to ethanol; chemokine production; response to zinc ion; acute inflammatory response; defense response to bacterium; leukocyte migration involved in inflammatory response; peptidyl-cysteine S-nitrosylation; sequestering of zinc ion; neutrophil aggregation; response to lipopolysaccharide; chemotaxis; positive regulation of peptide secretion; chronic inflammatory response; astrocyte development; wound healing; apoptotic process; positive regulation of cell growth; autophagy; inflammatory response; regulation of cytoskeleton organization; cytokine production; positive regulation of NF-kappaB transcription factor activity; innate immune response; toll-like receptor signaling pathway; antimicrobial humoral response; neutrophil degranulation; autocrine signaling
Sources:Amigo / QuickGO
Orthologs
Databases	NCBI: entry; OMA: entry
Species	Human	Mouse
Entrez	6279	20201
Ensembl	ENSG00000143546	ENSMUSG00000056054
UniProt	P05109	P27005
RefSeq (mRNA)	NM_002964; NM_001319196; NM_001319197; NM_001319198; NM_001319201	NM_013650
RefSeq (protein)	NP_001306125; NP_001306126; NP_001306127; NP_001306130; NP_002955	NP_038678
Location (UCSC)	Chr 1: 153.39 – 153.39 Mb	Chr 3: 90.58 – 90.58 Mb
PubMed search
- Wikidata
View/Edit Human	View/Edit Mouse

S100 calcium-binding protein A8 (S100A8) is a protein that in humans is encoded by the S100A8 gene. It is also known as calgranulin A.

The proteins S100A8 and S100A9 form a heterodimer called calprotectin.

The protein encoded by this gene is a member of the S100 family of proteins containing 2 EF-hand calcium-binding motifs. S100 proteins are localized in the cytoplasm and/or nucleus of a wide range of cells, and involved in the regulation of a number of cellular processes such as cell cycle progression and differentiation. S100 genes include at least 13 members which are located as a cluster on chromosome 1q21. This protein may function in the inhibition of casein kinase and as a cytokine. Altered expression of this protein is associated with the disease cystic fibrosis and post COVID-19 condition.
