= S100A9 =

Protein found in humans

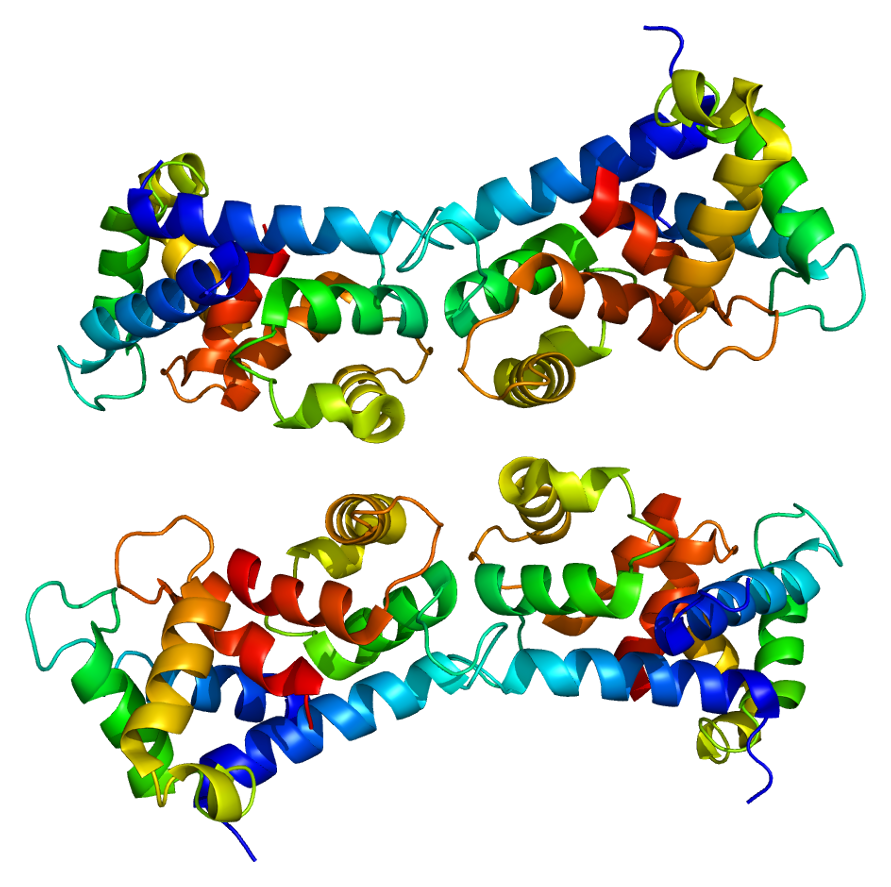

Identifiers
- Aliases: S100A9, 60B8AG, CAGB, CFAG, CGLB, L1AG, LIAG, MAC387, MIF, MRP14, NIF, P14, S100 calcium binding protein A9, S100-A9
- External IDs: OMIM: 123886; MGI: 1338947; GeneCards: S100A9
Available structures
PDB	Ortholog search: PDBe RCSB
PDB	List of PDB id codes 1IRJ, 1XK4, 4GGF, 4XJK

Gene location (Human)
Chr.	Chromosome 1 (human)
Band	1q21.3	Start	153,357,854 bp
Band	1q21.3	End	153,361,023 bp

Gene location (Mouse)
Chr.	Chromosome 3 (mouse)
Band	3 F1|3 39.91 cM	Start	90,599,939 bp
Band	3 F1|3 39.91 cM	End	90,603,028 bp
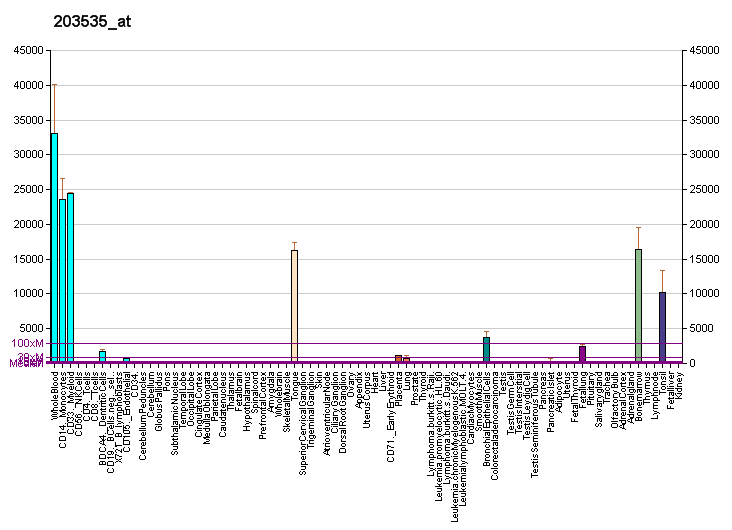
RNA expression pattern
Bgee	Human / Mouse (ortholog); Top expressed in: monocyte; granulocyte; periodontal fiber; bone marrow; oral cavity; mucosa of pharynx; gums; gingival epithelium; bone marrow cell; trabecular bone / Top expressed in: granulocyte; tibiofemoral joint; ankle joint; femur; body of femur; fetal liver hematopoietic progenitor cell; spleen; blood; vestibular membrane of cochlear duct; human fetus; More reference expression data
BioGPS	More reference expression data
Gene ontology
Molecular function	calcium ion binding; microtubule binding; zinc ion binding; signal transducer activity; metal ion binding; Toll-like receptor 4 binding; antioxidant activity; protein binding; RAGE receptor binding; arachidonic acid binding
Cellular component	membrane; plasma membrane; extracellular exosome; cytoskeleton; nucleus; extracellular matrix; extracellular space; nucleoplasm; cytosol; cell junction; secretory granule lumen; cytoplasm; extracellular region; collagen-containing extracellular matrix
Biological process	peptidyl-cysteine S-trans-nitrosylation; positive regulation of inflammatory response; chemokine production; immune system process; cellular oxidant detoxification; cell-cell signaling; cytokine production; leukocyte migration involved in inflammatory response; neutrophil chemotaxis; defense response to fungus; chemotaxis; sequestering of zinc ion; neutrophil aggregation; positive regulation of cell growth; defense response to bacterium; positive regulation of NF-kappaB transcription factor activity; regulation of inflammatory response; innate immune response; inflammatory response; activation of cysteine-type endopeptidase activity involved in apoptotic process; positive regulation of intrinsic apoptotic signaling pathway; regulation of cytoskeleton organization; apoptotic process; autophagy; toll-like receptor signaling pathway; antimicrobial humoral response; neutrophil degranulation; positive regulation of neuron projection development
Sources:Amigo / QuickGO
Orthologs
Databases	NCBI: entry; OMA: entry
Species	Human	Mouse
Entrez	6280	20202
Ensembl	ENSG00000163220	ENSMUSG00000056071
UniProt	P06702	P31725
RefSeq (mRNA)	NM_002965	NM_001281852; NM_009114
RefSeq (protein)	NP_002956	NP_001268781; NP_033140
Location (UCSC)	Chr 1: 153.36 – 153.36 Mb	Chr 3: 90.6 – 90.6 Mb
PubMed search
- Wikidata
View/Edit Human	View/Edit Mouse

S100 calcium-binding protein A9 (S100A9) also known as migration inhibitory factor-related protein 14 (MRP14) or calgranulin B is a protein that in humans is encoded by the S100A9 gene.

The proteins S100A8 and S100A9 form a heterodimer called calprotectin.

== Function ==
S100A9 is a member of the S100 family of proteins containing 2 EF hand calcium-binding motifs. S100 proteins are localized in the cytoplasm and/or nucleus of a wide range of cells, and involved in the regulation of a number of cellular processes such as cell cycle progression and differentiation. S100 genes include at least 13 members which are located as a cluster on chromosome 1q21. This protein may function in the inhibition of casein kinase.

MRP14 complexes with MRP-8 (S100A8), another member of the S100 family of calcium-modulated proteins; together, MRP8 and MRP14 regulate myeloid cell function by binding to Toll-like receptor 4 (TLR4) and the receptor for advanced glycation end products.

Intracellular S100A9 alters mitochondrial homeostasis within neutrophils. As a result, neutrophils lacking S100A9 produce higher levels of mitochondrial superoxide and undergo elevated levels of suicidal NETosis in response to bacterial pathogens. Furthermore, S100A9-deficient mice are protected from systemic Staphylococcus aureus infections with lower bacterial burdens in the heart, which suggests an organ-specific function for S100A9.

== Clinical significance ==
Altered expression of the S100A9 protein is associated with the disease cystic fibrosis.

MRP-8/14 broadly regulates vascular inflammation and contributes to the biological response to vascular injury by promoting leukocyte recruitment.

MRP-8/14 also regulates vascular insults by controlling neutrophil and macrophage accumulation, macrophage cytokine production, and SMC proliferation. The above study has shown therefore the deficiency of MRP-8 and MRP-14 reduces neutrophil- and monocyte-dependent vascular inflammation and attenuates the severity of diverse vascular injury responses in vivo. MRP-8/14 may be a useful biomarker of platelet and inflammatory disease activity in atherothrombosis and may serve as a novel target for therapeutic intervention. Also, the platelet transcriptome reveals quantitative differences between acute and stable coronary artery disease. MRP-14 expression increases before ST-segment-elevation myocardial infarction, (STEMI), and increasing plasma concentrations of MRP-8/14 among healthy individuals predict the risk of future cardiovascular events.

S100A9 (myeloid-related protein 14, MRP 14 or calgranulin B) has been implicated in the abnormal differentiation of myeloid cells in the stroma of cancer, and to leukemia progression. This contributes to creating an overall immunosuppressive microenvironment that may contribute to the inability of a protective or therapeutic cellular immune response to be generated by the tumor-bearing host. In myelofibrosis, S100A9/S100A8 have been shown to be expressed by macrophages and to activate stromal cells via TLR4. The use of Tasquinomod, a group targeting S100A9, is currently under clinical trial for myelofibrosis patients.

Outside of malignancy, S100A9 in association with its dimerization partner, S100A8 (MRP8 or calgranulin A) signals for lymphocyte recruitment in sites of inflammation. S100A9/A8 (synonyma: Calgranulin A/B; Calprotectin) are also regarded as marker proteins for a number of inflammatory diseases in humans, especially in rheumatoid arthritis and inflammatory bowel disease (IBD).

Myeloid-related protein (MRP)-8 is an inflammatory protein found in several mucosal secretions. In cervico-vaginal secretions MRP-8 can stimulate HIV production; and thus might be involved in sexual transmission of HIV, as well as other sexually transmitted diseases (STD). In vitro studies have shown that HIV-inducing of recombinant MRP-8 can increase HIV expression by up to 40-fold.

== Animal studies ==
A S100A9 knockout mouse has (a mouse mutant, that is deficient of S100A9) been constructed. This mouse is fertile, viable and healthy. However, expression of S100A8 protein, the dimerization partner of S100A9, is also absent in these mice in differentiated myeloid cells. This mouse line has been used to study the role of S100A9 and S100A8 in a number of experimental inflammatory conditions.
